

25001–25100 

|-bgcolor=#E9E9E9
| 25001 Pacheco ||  ||  || July 31, 1998 || Majorca || Á. López J. || — || align=right | 8.3 km || 
|-id=002 bgcolor=#fefefe
| 25002 ||  || — || July 26, 1998 || La Silla || E. W. Elst || NYS || align=right | 2.3 km || 
|-id=003 bgcolor=#fefefe
| 25003 ||  || — || July 26, 1998 || La Silla || E. W. Elst || FLO || align=right | 4.1 km || 
|-id=004 bgcolor=#fefefe
| 25004 ||  || — || July 26, 1998 || La Silla || E. W. Elst || — || align=right | 2.6 km || 
|-id=005 bgcolor=#fefefe
| 25005 ||  || — || July 26, 1998 || La Silla || E. W. Elst || — || align=right | 2.5 km || 
|-id=006 bgcolor=#fefefe
| 25006 ||  || — || July 26, 1998 || La Silla || E. W. Elst || — || align=right | 2.4 km || 
|-id=007 bgcolor=#fefefe
| 25007 || 1998 PJ || — || August 5, 1998 || Kleť || Kleť Obs. || NYS || align=right | 2.1 km || 
|-id=008 bgcolor=#fefefe
| 25008 || 1998 PL || — || August 8, 1998 || Woomera || F. B. Zoltowski || — || align=right | 2.7 km || 
|-id=009 bgcolor=#fefefe
| 25009 ||  || — || August 15, 1998 || Woomera || F. B. Zoltowski || — || align=right | 2.6 km || 
|-id=010 bgcolor=#fefefe
| 25010 ||  || — || August 14, 1998 || Majorca || Á. López J., R. Pacheco || — || align=right | 4.3 km || 
|-id=011 bgcolor=#d6d6d6
| 25011 ||  || — || August 13, 1998 || Xinglong || SCAP || — || align=right | 17 km || 
|-id=012 bgcolor=#fefefe
| 25012 || 1998 QC || — || August 17, 1998 || Višnjan Observatory || Višnjan Obs. || FLO || align=right | 3.1 km || 
|-id=013 bgcolor=#fefefe
| 25013 || 1998 QR || — || August 17, 1998 || Kleť || Kleť Obs. || FLO || align=right | 3.0 km || 
|-id=014 bgcolor=#fefefe
| 25014 Christinepalau || 1998 QT ||  || August 18, 1998 || Les Tardieux Obs. || M. Boeuf || — || align=right | 4.0 km || 
|-id=015 bgcolor=#fefefe
| 25015 Lairdclose ||  ||  || August 19, 1998 || Haleakala || NEAT || FLOmoon || align=right | 2.9 km || 
|-id=016 bgcolor=#fefefe
| 25016 ||  || — || August 18, 1998 || Reedy Creek || J. Broughton || NYS || align=right | 2.8 km || 
|-id=017 bgcolor=#d6d6d6
| 25017 ||  || — || August 24, 1998 || Caussols || ODAS || — || align=right | 8.4 km || 
|-id=018 bgcolor=#E9E9E9
| 25018 Valbousquet ||  ||  || August 24, 1998 || Caussols || ODAS || — || align=right | 3.4 km || 
|-id=019 bgcolor=#fefefe
| 25019 Walentosky ||  ||  || August 17, 1998 || Socorro || LINEAR || FLO || align=right | 3.1 km || 
|-id=020 bgcolor=#fefefe
| 25020 Tinyacheng ||  ||  || August 17, 1998 || Socorro || LINEAR || — || align=right | 2.4 km || 
|-id=021 bgcolor=#fefefe
| 25021 Nischaykumar ||  ||  || August 17, 1998 || Socorro || LINEAR || moon || align=right | 2.2 km || 
|-id=022 bgcolor=#fefefe
| 25022 Hemalibatra ||  ||  || August 17, 1998 || Socorro || LINEAR || — || align=right | 2.7 km || 
|-id=023 bgcolor=#fefefe
| 25023 Sundaresh ||  ||  || August 17, 1998 || Socorro || LINEAR || — || align=right | 2.2 km || 
|-id=024 bgcolor=#fefefe
| 25024 Calebmcgraw ||  ||  || August 17, 1998 || Socorro || LINEAR || NYS || align=right | 7.6 km || 
|-id=025 bgcolor=#E9E9E9
| 25025 Joshuavo ||  ||  || August 17, 1998 || Socorro || LINEAR || GEF || align=right | 3.1 km || 
|-id=026 bgcolor=#E9E9E9
| 25026 ||  || — || August 17, 1998 || Socorro || LINEAR || — || align=right | 4.0 km || 
|-id=027 bgcolor=#E9E9E9
| 25027 ||  || — || August 17, 1998 || Socorro || LINEAR || — || align=right | 4.6 km || 
|-id=028 bgcolor=#E9E9E9
| 25028 ||  || — || August 25, 1998 || Woomera || F. B. Zoltowski || — || align=right | 3.2 km || 
|-id=029 bgcolor=#E9E9E9
| 25029 Ludwighesse ||  ||  || August 26, 1998 || Prescott || P. G. Comba || — || align=right | 5.5 km || 
|-id=030 bgcolor=#fefefe
| 25030 ||  || — || August 22, 1998 || Xinglong || SCAP || ERI || align=right | 4.3 km || 
|-id=031 bgcolor=#fefefe
| 25031 ||  || — || August 23, 1998 || Višnjan Observatory || Višnjan Obs. || — || align=right | 3.3 km || 
|-id=032 bgcolor=#fefefe
| 25032 Randallray ||  ||  || August 17, 1998 || Socorro || LINEAR || FLO || align=right | 2.5 km || 
|-id=033 bgcolor=#E9E9E9
| 25033 ||  || — || August 17, 1998 || Socorro || LINEAR || — || align=right | 4.8 km || 
|-id=034 bgcolor=#fefefe
| 25034 Lesliemarie ||  ||  || August 17, 1998 || Socorro || LINEAR || — || align=right | 2.5 km || 
|-id=035 bgcolor=#E9E9E9
| 25035 Scalesse ||  ||  || August 17, 1998 || Socorro || LINEAR || — || align=right | 3.2 km || 
|-id=036 bgcolor=#fefefe
| 25036 Elizabethof ||  ||  || August 17, 1998 || Socorro || LINEAR || SUL || align=right | 7.1 km || 
|-id=037 bgcolor=#FA8072
| 25037 ||  || — || August 17, 1998 || Socorro || LINEAR || — || align=right | 2.9 km || 
|-id=038 bgcolor=#fefefe
| 25038 Matebezdek ||  ||  || August 17, 1998 || Socorro || LINEAR || — || align=right | 2.6 km || 
|-id=039 bgcolor=#fefefe
| 25039 Chensun ||  ||  || August 17, 1998 || Socorro || LINEAR || V || align=right | 2.1 km || 
|-id=040 bgcolor=#E9E9E9
| 25040 ||  || — || August 17, 1998 || Socorro || LINEAR || — || align=right | 4.6 km || 
|-id=041 bgcolor=#fefefe
| 25041 ||  || — || August 17, 1998 || Socorro || LINEAR || — || align=right | 2.6 km || 
|-id=042 bgcolor=#E9E9E9
| 25042 Qiujun ||  ||  || August 17, 1998 || Socorro || LINEAR || — || align=right | 9.5 km || 
|-id=043 bgcolor=#E9E9E9
| 25043 Fangxing ||  ||  || August 17, 1998 || Socorro || LINEAR || — || align=right | 4.9 km || 
|-id=044 bgcolor=#d6d6d6
| 25044 ||  || — || August 17, 1998 || Socorro || LINEAR || — || align=right | 4.3 km || 
|-id=045 bgcolor=#fefefe
| 25045 Baixuefei ||  ||  || August 17, 1998 || Socorro || LINEAR || FLO || align=right | 2.5 km || 
|-id=046 bgcolor=#fefefe
| 25046 Suyihan ||  ||  || August 17, 1998 || Socorro || LINEAR || MAS || align=right | 2.5 km || 
|-id=047 bgcolor=#fefefe
| 25047 Tsuitehsin ||  ||  || August 17, 1998 || Socorro || LINEAR || V || align=right | 2.1 km || 
|-id=048 bgcolor=#E9E9E9
| 25048 ||  || — || August 17, 1998 || Socorro || LINEAR || — || align=right | 5.1 km || 
|-id=049 bgcolor=#fefefe
| 25049 Christofnorn ||  ||  || August 17, 1998 || Socorro || LINEAR || — || align=right | 7.2 km || 
|-id=050 bgcolor=#fefefe
| 25050 Michmadsen ||  ||  || August 17, 1998 || Socorro || LINEAR || FLO || align=right | 3.4 km || 
|-id=051 bgcolor=#E9E9E9
| 25051 Vass ||  ||  || August 20, 1998 || Anderson Mesa || LONEOS || — || align=right | 7.7 km || 
|-id=052 bgcolor=#E9E9E9
| 25052 Rudawska ||  ||  || August 27, 1998 || Anderson Mesa || LONEOS || — || align=right | 2.3 km || 
|-id=053 bgcolor=#d6d6d6
| 25053 Matthewknight ||  ||  || August 27, 1998 || Anderson Mesa || LONEOS || EOS || align=right | 6.1 km || 
|-id=054 bgcolor=#fefefe
| 25054 ||  || — || August 26, 1998 || Caussols || ODAS || — || align=right | 2.4 km || 
|-id=055 bgcolor=#E9E9E9
| 25055 ||  || — || August 30, 1998 || Kitt Peak || Spacewatch || HEN || align=right | 3.5 km || 
|-id=056 bgcolor=#d6d6d6
| 25056 ||  || — || August 30, 1998 || Kitt Peak || Spacewatch || — || align=right | 9.1 km || 
|-id=057 bgcolor=#E9E9E9
| 25057 ||  || — || August 30, 1998 || Xinglong || SCAP || HNS || align=right | 4.6 km || 
|-id=058 bgcolor=#E9E9E9
| 25058 Shanegould ||  ||  || August 25, 1998 || Reedy Creek || J. Broughton || — || align=right | 2.9 km || 
|-id=059 bgcolor=#E9E9E9
| 25059 ||  || — || August 24, 1998 || Socorro || LINEAR || — || align=right | 3.6 km || 
|-id=060 bgcolor=#E9E9E9
| 25060 ||  || — || August 24, 1998 || Socorro || LINEAR || MAR || align=right | 3.6 km || 
|-id=061 bgcolor=#E9E9E9
| 25061 ||  || — || August 24, 1998 || Socorro || LINEAR || MAR || align=right | 2.3 km || 
|-id=062 bgcolor=#fefefe
| 25062 Rasmussen ||  ||  || August 24, 1998 || Socorro || LINEAR || V || align=right | 1.8 km || 
|-id=063 bgcolor=#E9E9E9
| 25063 ||  || — || August 24, 1998 || Socorro || LINEAR || MAR || align=right | 3.4 km || 
|-id=064 bgcolor=#E9E9E9
| 25064 ||  || — || August 24, 1998 || Socorro || LINEAR || EUN || align=right | 6.7 km || 
|-id=065 bgcolor=#fefefe
| 25065 Lautakkin ||  ||  || August 24, 1998 || Socorro || LINEAR || — || align=right | 4.1 km || 
|-id=066 bgcolor=#E9E9E9
| 25066 ||  || — || August 24, 1998 || Socorro || LINEAR || GEF || align=right | 5.6 km || 
|-id=067 bgcolor=#E9E9E9
| 25067 ||  || — || August 24, 1998 || Socorro || LINEAR || — || align=right | 4.3 km || 
|-id=068 bgcolor=#fefefe
| 25068 ||  || — || August 24, 1998 || Socorro || LINEAR || — || align=right | 5.4 km || 
|-id=069 bgcolor=#E9E9E9
| 25069 ||  || — || August 24, 1998 || Socorro || LINEAR || EUN || align=right | 4.0 km || 
|-id=070 bgcolor=#E9E9E9
| 25070 ||  || — || August 28, 1998 || Socorro || LINEAR || — || align=right | 3.6 km || 
|-id=071 bgcolor=#d6d6d6
| 25071 ||  || — || August 28, 1998 || Socorro || LINEAR || JLI || align=right | 7.8 km || 
|-id=072 bgcolor=#E9E9E9
| 25072 ||  || — || August 28, 1998 || Socorro || LINEAR || — || align=right | 4.3 km || 
|-id=073 bgcolor=#E9E9E9
| 25073 Lautakshing ||  ||  || August 17, 1998 || Socorro || LINEAR || — || align=right | 2.5 km || 
|-id=074 bgcolor=#fefefe
| 25074 Honami ||  ||  || August 19, 1998 || Socorro || LINEAR || — || align=right | 2.9 km || 
|-id=075 bgcolor=#E9E9E9
| 25075 Kiyomoto ||  ||  || August 28, 1998 || Socorro || LINEAR || — || align=right | 4.6 km || 
|-id=076 bgcolor=#fefefe
| 25076 ||  || — || August 28, 1998 || Socorro || LINEAR || H || align=right | 1.8 km || 
|-id=077 bgcolor=#fefefe
| 25077 ||  || — || August 26, 1998 || La Silla || E. W. Elst || NYS || align=right | 2.5 km || 
|-id=078 bgcolor=#fefefe
| 25078 ||  || — || August 26, 1998 || La Silla || E. W. Elst || NYS || align=right | 1.9 km || 
|-id=079 bgcolor=#E9E9E9
| 25079 ||  || — || August 26, 1998 || La Silla || E. W. Elst || AGN || align=right | 5.6 km || 
|-id=080 bgcolor=#d6d6d6
| 25080 ||  || — || August 26, 1998 || La Silla || E. W. Elst || — || align=right | 4.7 km || 
|-id=081 bgcolor=#E9E9E9
| 25081 ||  || — || August 17, 1998 || Socorro || LINEAR || — || align=right | 3.6 km || 
|-id=082 bgcolor=#E9E9E9
| 25082 Williamhodge ||  ||  || September 15, 1998 || Prescott || P. G. Comba || — || align=right | 5.2 km || 
|-id=083 bgcolor=#E9E9E9
| 25083 ||  || — || September 14, 1998 || Catalina || CSS || GEF || align=right | 5.0 km || 
|-id=084 bgcolor=#E9E9E9
| 25084 Jutzi ||  ||  || September 15, 1998 || Anderson Mesa || LONEOS || EUN || align=right | 5.1 km || 
|-id=085 bgcolor=#E9E9E9
| 25085 Melena ||  ||  || September 14, 1998 || Anderson Mesa || LONEOS || — || align=right | 3.4 km || 
|-id=086 bgcolor=#E9E9E9
| 25086 ||  || — || September 13, 1998 || Kitt Peak || Spacewatch || — || align=right | 6.3 km || 
|-id=087 bgcolor=#E9E9E9
| 25087 Kaztaniguchi ||  ||  || September 14, 1998 || Socorro || LINEAR || — || align=right | 3.3 km || 
|-id=088 bgcolor=#E9E9E9
| 25088 Yoshimura ||  ||  || September 14, 1998 || Socorro || LINEAR || — || align=right | 2.7 km || 
|-id=089 bgcolor=#fefefe
| 25089 Sanabria-Rivera ||  ||  || September 14, 1998 || Socorro || LINEAR || — || align=right | 2.4 km || 
|-id=090 bgcolor=#E9E9E9
| 25090 ||  || — || September 14, 1998 || Socorro || LINEAR || — || align=right | 3.3 km || 
|-id=091 bgcolor=#E9E9E9
| 25091 Sanchez-Claudio ||  ||  || September 14, 1998 || Socorro || LINEAR || GEF || align=right | 3.5 km || 
|-id=092 bgcolor=#E9E9E9
| 25092 ||  || — || September 14, 1998 || Socorro || LINEAR || — || align=right | 6.4 km || 
|-id=093 bgcolor=#fefefe
| 25093 Andmikhaylov ||  ||  || September 14, 1998 || Socorro || LINEAR || — || align=right | 2.8 km || 
|-id=094 bgcolor=#E9E9E9
| 25094 Zemtsov ||  ||  || September 14, 1998 || Socorro || LINEAR || — || align=right | 6.4 km || 
|-id=095 bgcolor=#fefefe
| 25095 Churinov ||  ||  || September 14, 1998 || Socorro || LINEAR || V || align=right | 2.9 km || 
|-id=096 bgcolor=#fefefe
| 25096 ||  || — || September 14, 1998 || Socorro || LINEAR || — || align=right | 2.5 km || 
|-id=097 bgcolor=#fefefe
| 25097 ||  || — || September 14, 1998 || Socorro || LINEAR || V || align=right | 3.0 km || 
|-id=098 bgcolor=#fefefe
| 25098 Gridnev ||  ||  || September 14, 1998 || Socorro || LINEAR || — || align=right | 3.9 km || 
|-id=099 bgcolor=#E9E9E9
| 25099 Mashinskiy ||  ||  || September 14, 1998 || Socorro || LINEAR || — || align=right | 5.4 km || 
|-id=100 bgcolor=#fefefe
| 25100 Zhaiweichao ||  ||  || September 14, 1998 || Socorro || LINEAR || — || align=right | 4.3 km || 
|}

25101–25200 

|-bgcolor=#E9E9E9
| 25101 ||  || — || September 14, 1998 || Socorro || LINEAR || — || align=right | 9.6 km || 
|-id=102 bgcolor=#E9E9E9
| 25102 Zhaoye ||  ||  || September 14, 1998 || Socorro || LINEAR || — || align=right | 3.0 km || 
|-id=103 bgcolor=#fefefe
| 25103 Kimdongyoung ||  ||  || September 14, 1998 || Socorro || LINEAR || — || align=right | 3.1 km || 
|-id=104 bgcolor=#E9E9E9
| 25104 Chohyunghoon ||  ||  || September 14, 1998 || Socorro || LINEAR || — || align=right | 5.0 km || 
|-id=105 bgcolor=#E9E9E9
| 25105 Kimnayeon ||  ||  || September 14, 1998 || Socorro || LINEAR || WIT || align=right | 3.6 km || 
|-id=106 bgcolor=#d6d6d6
| 25106 Ryoojungmin ||  ||  || September 14, 1998 || Socorro || LINEAR || KOR || align=right | 3.1 km || 
|-id=107 bgcolor=#d6d6d6
| 25107 ||  || — || September 14, 1998 || Socorro || LINEAR || — || align=right | 9.0 km || 
|-id=108 bgcolor=#E9E9E9
| 25108 Boström ||  ||  || September 14, 1998 || Socorro || LINEAR || — || align=right | 6.8 km || 
|-id=109 bgcolor=#fefefe
| 25109 Hofving ||  ||  || September 14, 1998 || Socorro || LINEAR || NYS || align=right | 1.9 km || 
|-id=110 bgcolor=#d6d6d6
| 25110 ||  || — || September 14, 1998 || Socorro || LINEAR || EOS || align=right | 5.4 km || 
|-id=111 bgcolor=#fefefe
| 25111 Klokun ||  ||  || September 14, 1998 || Socorro || LINEAR || — || align=right | 2.7 km || 
|-id=112 bgcolor=#d6d6d6
| 25112 Mymeshkovych ||  ||  || September 14, 1998 || Socorro || LINEAR || KOR || align=right | 4.5 km || 
|-id=113 bgcolor=#E9E9E9
| 25113 Benwasserman ||  ||  || September 14, 1998 || Socorro || LINEAR || — || align=right | 3.8 km || 
|-id=114 bgcolor=#E9E9E9
| 25114 ||  || — || September 14, 1998 || Socorro || LINEAR || — || align=right | 3.1 km || 
|-id=115 bgcolor=#E9E9E9
| 25115 Drago ||  ||  || September 14, 1998 || Socorro || LINEAR || — || align=right | 3.8 km || 
|-id=116 bgcolor=#fefefe
| 25116 Jonathanwang ||  ||  || September 14, 1998 || Socorro || LINEAR || — || align=right | 2.9 km || 
|-id=117 bgcolor=#E9E9E9
| 25117 ||  || — || September 14, 1998 || Socorro || LINEAR || — || align=right | 4.9 km || 
|-id=118 bgcolor=#E9E9E9
| 25118 Kevlin ||  ||  || September 14, 1998 || Socorro || LINEAR || MRX || align=right | 3.3 km || 
|-id=119 bgcolor=#d6d6d6
| 25119 Kakani ||  ||  || September 14, 1998 || Socorro || LINEAR || — || align=right | 7.6 km || 
|-id=120 bgcolor=#E9E9E9
| 25120 Yvetteleung ||  ||  || September 14, 1998 || Socorro || LINEAR || — || align=right | 2.7 km || 
|-id=121 bgcolor=#E9E9E9
| 25121 ||  || — || September 14, 1998 || Socorro || LINEAR || — || align=right | 3.5 km || 
|-id=122 bgcolor=#E9E9E9
| 25122 Kaitlingus ||  ||  || September 14, 1998 || Socorro || LINEAR || — || align=right | 2.7 km || 
|-id=123 bgcolor=#d6d6d6
| 25123 ||  || — || September 14, 1998 || Socorro || LINEAR || KOR || align=right | 4.5 km || 
|-id=124 bgcolor=#E9E9E9
| 25124 Zahramaarouf ||  ||  || September 14, 1998 || Socorro || LINEAR || AGN || align=right | 3.7 km || 
|-id=125 bgcolor=#E9E9E9
| 25125 Brodallan ||  ||  || September 14, 1998 || Socorro || LINEAR || — || align=right | 3.6 km || 
|-id=126 bgcolor=#fefefe
| 25126 ||  || — || September 14, 1998 || Socorro || LINEAR || NYS || align=right | 2.6 km || 
|-id=127 bgcolor=#d6d6d6
| 25127 Laurentbrunetto || 1998 SZ ||  || September 16, 1998 || Caussols || ODAS || — || align=right | 6.0 km || 
|-id=128 bgcolor=#d6d6d6
| 25128 ||  || — || September 16, 1998 || Caussols || ODAS || THM || align=right | 8.5 km || 
|-id=129 bgcolor=#fefefe
| 25129 Uranoscope ||  ||  || September 16, 1998 || Caussols || ODAS || — || align=right | 2.6 km || 
|-id=130 bgcolor=#E9E9E9
| 25130 ||  || — || September 16, 1998 || Caussols || ODAS || — || align=right | 8.3 km || 
|-id=131 bgcolor=#E9E9E9
| 25131 Katiemelua ||  ||  || September 18, 1998 || Caussols || ODAS || MRX || align=right | 3.2 km || 
|-id=132 bgcolor=#E9E9E9
| 25132 ||  || — || September 17, 1998 || Xinglong || SCAP || — || align=right | 8.5 km || 
|-id=133 bgcolor=#E9E9E9
| 25133 Douglin ||  ||  || September 18, 1998 || Anderson Mesa || LONEOS || — || align=right | 2.4 km || 
|-id=134 bgcolor=#d6d6d6
| 25134 ||  || — || September 17, 1998 || Kitt Peak || Spacewatch || — || align=right | 6.8 km || 
|-id=135 bgcolor=#fefefe
| 25135 ||  || — || September 23, 1998 || Višnjan Observatory || Višnjan Obs. || NYS || align=right | 2.2 km || 
|-id=136 bgcolor=#E9E9E9
| 25136 ||  || — || September 23, 1998 || Višnjan Observatory || Višnjan Obs. || — || align=right | 2.0 km || 
|-id=137 bgcolor=#fefefe
| 25137 Seansolomon ||  ||  || September 17, 1998 || Anderson Mesa || LONEOS || — || align=right | 3.0 km || 
|-id=138 bgcolor=#E9E9E9
| 25138 Jaumann ||  ||  || September 17, 1998 || Anderson Mesa || LONEOS || — || align=right | 4.5 km || 
|-id=139 bgcolor=#E9E9E9
| 25139 Roatsch ||  ||  || September 22, 1998 || Anderson Mesa || LONEOS || NEM || align=right | 7.6 km || 
|-id=140 bgcolor=#fefefe
| 25140 Schmedemann ||  ||  || September 22, 1998 || Anderson Mesa || LONEOS || — || align=right | 2.8 km || 
|-id=141 bgcolor=#E9E9E9
| 25141 ||  || — || September 20, 1998 || Xinglong || SCAP || — || align=right | 2.3 km || 
|-id=142 bgcolor=#E9E9E9
| 25142 Hopf ||  ||  || September 26, 1998 || Prescott || P. G. Comba || — || align=right | 4.9 km || 
|-id=143 bgcolor=#FFC2E0
| 25143 Itokawa ||  ||  || September 26, 1998 || Socorro || LINEAR || APOPHA || align=right data-sort-value="0.33" | 330 m || 
|-id=144 bgcolor=#E9E9E9
| 25144 ||  || — || September 23, 1998 || Xinglong || SCAP || — || align=right | 4.5 km || 
|-id=145 bgcolor=#d6d6d6
| 25145 ||  || — || September 23, 1998 || Xinglong || SCAP || URS || align=right | 8.4 km || 
|-id=146 bgcolor=#E9E9E9
| 25146 Xiada ||  ||  || September 24, 1998 || Xinglong || SCAP || — || align=right | 3.8 km || 
|-id=147 bgcolor=#E9E9E9
| 25147 ||  || — || September 25, 1998 || Kitt Peak || Spacewatch || — || align=right | 3.5 km || 
|-id=148 bgcolor=#d6d6d6
| 25148 ||  || — || September 25, 1998 || Kitt Peak || Spacewatch || — || align=right | 7.0 km || 
|-id=149 bgcolor=#d6d6d6
| 25149 ||  || — || September 22, 1998 || Bergisch Gladbach || W. Bickel || — || align=right | 5.5 km || 
|-id=150 bgcolor=#fefefe
| 25150 ||  || — || September 26, 1998 || Kitt Peak || Spacewatch || NYS || align=right | 2.1 km || 
|-id=151 bgcolor=#E9E9E9
| 25151 Stefanschröder ||  ||  || September 16, 1998 || Anderson Mesa || LONEOS || PAE || align=right | 7.9 km || 
|-id=152 bgcolor=#E9E9E9
| 25152 Toplis ||  ||  || September 16, 1998 || Anderson Mesa || LONEOS || — || align=right | 3.7 km || 
|-id=153 bgcolor=#fefefe
| 25153 Tomhockey ||  ||  || September 16, 1998 || Anderson Mesa || LONEOS || — || align=right | 3.0 km || 
|-id=154 bgcolor=#d6d6d6
| 25154 Ayers ||  ||  || September 16, 1998 || Anderson Mesa || LONEOS || THM || align=right | 7.5 km || 
|-id=155 bgcolor=#d6d6d6
| 25155 van Belle ||  ||  || September 16, 1998 || Anderson Mesa || LONEOS || KOR || align=right | 3.9 km || 
|-id=156 bgcolor=#E9E9E9
| 25156 Shkolnik ||  ||  || September 16, 1998 || Anderson Mesa || LONEOS || — || align=right | 4.9 km || 
|-id=157 bgcolor=#d6d6d6
| 25157 Fabian ||  ||  || September 16, 1998 || Anderson Mesa || LONEOS || THM || align=right | 5.5 km || 
|-id=158 bgcolor=#fefefe
| 25158 Berman ||  ||  || September 17, 1998 || Anderson Mesa || LONEOS || — || align=right | 3.2 km || 
|-id=159 bgcolor=#E9E9E9
| 25159 Michaelwest ||  ||  || September 17, 1998 || Anderson Mesa || LONEOS || — || align=right | 11 km || 
|-id=160 bgcolor=#fefefe
| 25160 Joellama ||  ||  || September 17, 1998 || Anderson Mesa || LONEOS || NYS || align=right | 2.4 km || 
|-id=161 bgcolor=#fefefe
| 25161 Strosahl ||  ||  || September 17, 1998 || Anderson Mesa || LONEOS || V || align=right | 3.2 km || 
|-id=162 bgcolor=#fefefe
| 25162 Beckage ||  ||  || September 17, 1998 || Anderson Mesa || LONEOS || NYS || align=right | 1.8 km || 
|-id=163 bgcolor=#d6d6d6
| 25163 Williammcdonald ||  ||  || September 17, 1998 || Anderson Mesa || LONEOS || VER || align=right | 8.6 km || 
|-id=164 bgcolor=#fefefe
| 25164 Sonomastate ||  ||  || September 19, 1998 || Anderson Mesa || LONEOS || — || align=right | 3.2 km || 
|-id=165 bgcolor=#fefefe
| 25165 Leget ||  ||  || September 19, 1998 || Anderson Mesa || LONEOS || — || align=right | 3.1 km || 
|-id=166 bgcolor=#d6d6d6
| 25166 Thompson ||  ||  || September 19, 1998 || Anderson Mesa || LONEOS || NAE || align=right | 8.3 km || 
|-id=167 bgcolor=#E9E9E9
| 25167 ||  || — || September 20, 1998 || La Silla || E. W. Elst || EUN || align=right | 2.9 km || 
|-id=168 bgcolor=#E9E9E9
| 25168 ||  || — || September 20, 1998 || La Silla || E. W. Elst || — || align=right | 2.7 km || 
|-id=169 bgcolor=#fefefe
| 25169 ||  || — || September 20, 1998 || La Silla || E. W. Elst || — || align=right | 2.9 km || 
|-id=170 bgcolor=#E9E9E9
| 25170 ||  || — || September 20, 1998 || La Silla || E. W. Elst || — || align=right | 3.4 km || 
|-id=171 bgcolor=#d6d6d6
| 25171 ||  || — || September 20, 1998 || La Silla || E. W. Elst || KOR || align=right | 3.8 km || 
|-id=172 bgcolor=#E9E9E9
| 25172 ||  || — || September 20, 1998 || La Silla || E. W. Elst || — || align=right | 5.2 km || 
|-id=173 bgcolor=#d6d6d6
| 25173 ||  || — || September 21, 1998 || La Silla || E. W. Elst || KOR || align=right | 5.2 km || 
|-id=174 bgcolor=#E9E9E9
| 25174 ||  || — || September 21, 1998 || La Silla || E. W. Elst || EUN || align=right | 4.1 km || 
|-id=175 bgcolor=#E9E9E9
| 25175 Lukeandraka ||  ||  || September 29, 1998 || Socorro || LINEAR || — || align=right | 3.0 km || 
|-id=176 bgcolor=#E9E9E9
| 25176 Thomasaunins ||  ||  || September 26, 1998 || Socorro || LINEAR || HEN || align=right | 2.7 km || 
|-id=177 bgcolor=#E9E9E9
| 25177 ||  || — || September 26, 1998 || Socorro || LINEAR || — || align=right | 3.0 km || 
|-id=178 bgcolor=#fefefe
| 25178 Shreebose ||  ||  || September 26, 1998 || Socorro || LINEAR || NYS || align=right | 2.1 km || 
|-id=179 bgcolor=#E9E9E9
| 25179 ||  || — || September 26, 1998 || Socorro || LINEAR || CLO || align=right | 8.4 km || 
|-id=180 bgcolor=#E9E9E9
| 25180 Kenyonconlin ||  ||  || September 26, 1998 || Socorro || LINEAR || — || align=right | 4.4 km || 
|-id=181 bgcolor=#d6d6d6
| 25181 ||  || — || September 26, 1998 || Socorro || LINEAR || — || align=right | 9.5 km || 
|-id=182 bgcolor=#E9E9E9
| 25182 Siddhawan ||  ||  || September 26, 1998 || Socorro || LINEAR || — || align=right | 4.2 km || 
|-id=183 bgcolor=#d6d6d6
| 25183 Grantfisher ||  ||  || September 26, 1998 || Socorro || LINEAR || KOR || align=right | 3.7 km || 
|-id=184 bgcolor=#E9E9E9
| 25184 Taylorgaines ||  ||  || September 26, 1998 || Socorro || LINEAR || — || align=right | 3.4 km || 
|-id=185 bgcolor=#d6d6d6
| 25185 ||  || — || September 26, 1998 || Socorro || LINEAR || — || align=right | 7.6 km || 
|-id=186 bgcolor=#E9E9E9
| 25186 ||  || — || September 26, 1998 || Socorro || LINEAR || — || align=right | 3.6 km || 
|-id=187 bgcolor=#E9E9E9
| 25187 ||  || — || September 26, 1998 || Socorro || LINEAR || WIT || align=right | 5.2 km || 
|-id=188 bgcolor=#E9E9E9
| 25188 ||  || — || September 26, 1998 || Socorro || LINEAR || — || align=right | 8.3 km || 
|-id=189 bgcolor=#E9E9E9
| 25189 Glockner ||  ||  || September 26, 1998 || Socorro || LINEAR || — || align=right | 2.9 km || 
|-id=190 bgcolor=#E9E9E9
| 25190 Thomasgoodin ||  ||  || September 26, 1998 || Socorro || LINEAR || GEF || align=right | 3.8 km || 
|-id=191 bgcolor=#E9E9E9
| 25191 Rachelouise ||  ||  || September 26, 1998 || Socorro || LINEAR || — || align=right | 7.0 km || 
|-id=192 bgcolor=#d6d6d6
| 25192 ||  || — || September 26, 1998 || Socorro || LINEAR || KOR || align=right | 4.8 km || 
|-id=193 bgcolor=#E9E9E9
| 25193 Taliagreene ||  ||  || September 26, 1998 || Socorro || LINEAR || — || align=right | 3.9 km || 
|-id=194 bgcolor=#E9E9E9
| 25194 ||  || — || September 26, 1998 || Socorro || LINEAR || HOF || align=right | 9.8 km || 
|-id=195 bgcolor=#fefefe
| 25195 ||  || — || September 26, 1998 || Socorro || LINEAR || NYS || align=right | 2.3 km || 
|-id=196 bgcolor=#d6d6d6
| 25196 ||  || — || September 26, 1998 || Socorro || LINEAR || THM || align=right | 8.4 km || 
|-id=197 bgcolor=#d6d6d6
| 25197 ||  || — || September 26, 1998 || Socorro || LINEAR || KOR || align=right | 5.2 km || 
|-id=198 bgcolor=#d6d6d6
| 25198 Kylienicole ||  ||  || September 26, 1998 || Socorro || LINEAR || KOR || align=right | 3.7 km || 
|-id=199 bgcolor=#E9E9E9
| 25199 Jiahegu ||  ||  || September 26, 1998 || Socorro || LINEAR || HOF || align=right | 11 km || 
|-id=200 bgcolor=#d6d6d6
| 25200 ||  || — || September 26, 1998 || Socorro || LINEAR || — || align=right | 9.3 km || 
|}

25201–25300 

|-bgcolor=#E9E9E9
| 25201 ||  || — || September 26, 1998 || Socorro || LINEAR || — || align=right | 3.3 km || 
|-id=202 bgcolor=#d6d6d6
| 25202 ||  || — || September 26, 1998 || Socorro || LINEAR || — || align=right | 3.6 km || 
|-id=203 bgcolor=#E9E9E9
| 25203 ||  || — || September 18, 1998 || La Silla || E. W. Elst || — || align=right | 4.0 km || 
|-id=204 bgcolor=#E9E9E9
| 25204 ||  || — || September 20, 1998 || La Silla || E. W. Elst || — || align=right | 7.0 km || 
|-id=205 bgcolor=#d6d6d6
| 25205 ||  || — || September 20, 1998 || La Silla || E. W. Elst || — || align=right | 5.6 km || 
|-id=206 bgcolor=#E9E9E9
| 25206 ||  || — || September 20, 1998 || La Silla || E. W. Elst || MRX || align=right | 3.8 km || 
|-id=207 bgcolor=#fefefe
| 25207 ||  || — || September 20, 1998 || La Silla || E. W. Elst || NYS || align=right | 2.1 km || 
|-id=208 bgcolor=#d6d6d6
| 25208 ||  || — || September 20, 1998 || La Silla || E. W. Elst || — || align=right | 11 km || 
|-id=209 bgcolor=#E9E9E9
| 25209 ||  || — || September 20, 1998 || La Silla || E. W. Elst || HEN || align=right | 3.5 km || 
|-id=210 bgcolor=#d6d6d6
| 25210 ||  || — || September 20, 1998 || La Silla || E. W. Elst || — || align=right | 7.7 km || 
|-id=211 bgcolor=#E9E9E9
| 25211 ||  || — || September 20, 1998 || La Silla || E. W. Elst || — || align=right | 6.0 km || 
|-id=212 bgcolor=#E9E9E9
| 25212 Ayushgupta ||  ||  || September 26, 1998 || Socorro || LINEAR || — || align=right | 2.8 km || 
|-id=213 bgcolor=#E9E9E9
| 25213 ||  || — || September 26, 1998 || Socorro || LINEAR || — || align=right | 1.8 km || 
|-id=214 bgcolor=#d6d6d6
| 25214 ||  || — || September 26, 1998 || Socorro || LINEAR || EOS || align=right | 5.0 km || 
|-id=215 bgcolor=#fefefe
| 25215 ||  || — || September 18, 1998 || La Silla || E. W. Elst || FLO || align=right | 3.0 km || 
|-id=216 bgcolor=#E9E9E9
| 25216 Enricobernardi ||  ||  || October 10, 1998 || Pleiade || F. Castellani, I. Dal Prete || EUN || align=right | 4.4 km || 
|-id=217 bgcolor=#E9E9E9
| 25217 ||  || — || October 13, 1998 || Reedy Creek || J. Broughton || GEF || align=right | 3.0 km || 
|-id=218 bgcolor=#E9E9E9
| 25218 ||  || — || October 13, 1998 || Reedy Creek || J. Broughton || — || align=right | 6.3 km || 
|-id=219 bgcolor=#E9E9E9
| 25219 ||  || — || October 13, 1998 || Višnjan Observatory || K. Korlević || — || align=right | 3.9 km || 
|-id=220 bgcolor=#fefefe
| 25220 ||  || — || October 15, 1998 || Reedy Creek || J. Broughton || V || align=right | 2.7 km || 
|-id=221 bgcolor=#d6d6d6
| 25221 ||  || — || October 12, 1998 || Kitt Peak || Spacewatch || THM || align=right | 7.5 km || 
|-id=222 bgcolor=#E9E9E9
| 25222 ||  || — || October 13, 1998 || Kitt Peak || Spacewatch || — || align=right | 4.1 km || 
|-id=223 bgcolor=#d6d6d6
| 25223 ||  || — || October 14, 1998 || Kitt Peak || Spacewatch || EOS || align=right | 5.0 km || 
|-id=224 bgcolor=#E9E9E9
| 25224 ||  || — || October 14, 1998 || Kitt Peak || Spacewatch || — || align=right | 4.7 km || 
|-id=225 bgcolor=#fefefe
| 25225 Patrickbenson ||  ||  || October 10, 1998 || Anderson Mesa || LONEOS || MAS || align=right | 2.6 km || 
|-id=226 bgcolor=#fefefe
| 25226 Brasch ||  ||  || October 10, 1998 || Anderson Mesa || LONEOS || MAS || align=right | 2.4 km || 
|-id=227 bgcolor=#E9E9E9
| 25227 Genehill ||  ||  || October 10, 1998 || Anderson Mesa || LONEOS || — || align=right | 3.5 km || 
|-id=228 bgcolor=#d6d6d6
| 25228 Mikekitt ||  ||  || October 10, 1998 || Anderson Mesa || LONEOS || — || align=right | 6.6 km || 
|-id=229 bgcolor=#E9E9E9
| 25229 Karenkitt ||  ||  || October 10, 1998 || Anderson Mesa || LONEOS || — || align=right | 3.2 km || 
|-id=230 bgcolor=#d6d6d6
| 25230 Borgis ||  ||  || October 11, 1998 || Anderson Mesa || LONEOS || — || align=right | 5.8 km || 
|-id=231 bgcolor=#E9E9E9
| 25231 Naylor ||  ||  || October 14, 1998 || Anderson Mesa || LONEOS || — || align=right | 5.7 km || 
|-id=232 bgcolor=#d6d6d6
| 25232 Schatz ||  ||  || October 14, 1998 || Anderson Mesa || LONEOS || KOR || align=right | 5.4 km || 
|-id=233 bgcolor=#d6d6d6
| 25233 Tallman ||  ||  || October 14, 1998 || Anderson Mesa || LONEOS || EOS || align=right | 6.8 km || 
|-id=234 bgcolor=#d6d6d6
| 25234 Odell ||  ||  || October 14, 1998 || Anderson Mesa || LONEOS || EOS || align=right | 7.0 km || 
|-id=235 bgcolor=#d6d6d6
| 25235 ||  || — || October 20, 1998 || Caussols || ODAS || KOR || align=right | 3.8 km || 
|-id=236 bgcolor=#d6d6d6
| 25236 ||  || — || October 18, 1998 || Gekko || T. Kagawa || — || align=right | 7.2 km || 
|-id=237 bgcolor=#d6d6d6
| 25237 Hurwitz ||  ||  || October 20, 1998 || Prescott || P. G. Comba || — || align=right | 7.2 km || 
|-id=238 bgcolor=#E9E9E9
| 25238 ||  || — || October 21, 1998 || Višnjan Observatory || K. Korlević || — || align=right | 4.4 km || 
|-id=239 bgcolor=#E9E9E9
| 25239 ||  || — || October 23, 1998 || Višnjan Observatory || K. Korlević || — || align=right | 6.9 km || 
|-id=240 bgcolor=#E9E9E9
| 25240 Qiansanqiang ||  ||  || October 16, 1998 || Xinglong || SCAP || HOF || align=right | 10 km || 
|-id=241 bgcolor=#d6d6d6
| 25241 ||  || — || October 23, 1998 || Kitt Peak || Spacewatch || KOR || align=right | 6.0 km || 
|-id=242 bgcolor=#E9E9E9
| 25242 ||  || — || October 20, 1998 || Granville || R. G. Davis || — || align=right | 5.4 km || 
|-id=243 bgcolor=#E9E9E9
| 25243 ||  || — || October 23, 1998 || Višnjan Observatory || K. Korlević || — || align=right | 5.6 km || 
|-id=244 bgcolor=#fefefe
| 25244 ||  || — || October 24, 1998 || Višnjan Observatory || K. Korlević || NYS || align=right | 2.4 km || 
|-id=245 bgcolor=#d6d6d6
| 25245 ||  || — || October 26, 1998 || Višnjan Observatory || K. Korlević || HYG || align=right | 9.3 km || 
|-id=246 bgcolor=#d6d6d6
| 25246 ||  || — || October 26, 1998 || Višnjan Observatory || K. Korlević || — || align=right | 5.0 km || 
|-id=247 bgcolor=#d6d6d6
| 25247 ||  || — || October 23, 1998 || Višnjan Observatory || K. Korlević || — || align=right | 4.3 km || 
|-id=248 bgcolor=#d6d6d6
| 25248 ||  || — || October 24, 1998 || Višnjan Observatory || K. Korlević || THM || align=right | 7.7 km || 
|-id=249 bgcolor=#E9E9E9
| 25249 ||  || — || October 31, 1998 || Gekko || T. Kagawa || MIT || align=right | 7.7 km || 
|-id=250 bgcolor=#E9E9E9
| 25250 Jonnapeterson ||  ||  || October 17, 1998 || Anderson Mesa || LONEOS || RAF || align=right | 2.8 km || 
|-id=251 bgcolor=#E9E9E9
| 25251 ||  || — || October 18, 1998 || La Silla || E. W. Elst || — || align=right | 3.0 km || 
|-id=252 bgcolor=#E9E9E9
| 25252 ||  || — || October 18, 1998 || La Silla || E. W. Elst || — || align=right | 4.7 km || 
|-id=253 bgcolor=#E9E9E9
| 25253 ||  || — || October 18, 1998 || La Silla || E. W. Elst || GEF || align=right | 5.0 km || 
|-id=254 bgcolor=#d6d6d6
| 25254 ||  || — || October 29, 1998 || Xinglong || SCAP || EOS || align=right | 6.1 km || 
|-id=255 bgcolor=#E9E9E9
| 25255 ||  || — || October 28, 1998 || Socorro || LINEAR || MIT || align=right | 6.6 km || 
|-id=256 bgcolor=#fefefe
| 25256 Imbrie-Moore ||  ||  || October 28, 1998 || Socorro || LINEAR || NYS || align=right | 2.5 km || 
|-id=257 bgcolor=#E9E9E9
| 25257 Elizmakarron ||  ||  || October 28, 1998 || Socorro || LINEAR || — || align=right | 3.3 km || 
|-id=258 bgcolor=#d6d6d6
| 25258 Nathaniel || 1998 VU ||  || November 7, 1998 || Kleť || M. Tichý, J. Tichá || — || align=right | 5.9 km || 
|-id=259 bgcolor=#d6d6d6
| 25259 Lucarnold ||  ||  || November 11, 1998 || Caussols || ODAS || — || align=right | 6.8 km || 
|-id=260 bgcolor=#d6d6d6
| 25260 ||  || — || November 8, 1998 || Nachi-Katsuura || Y. Shimizu, T. Urata || — || align=right | 10 km || 
|-id=261 bgcolor=#d6d6d6
| 25261 ||  || — || November 11, 1998 || Gekko || T. Kagawa || — || align=right | 8.0 km || 
|-id=262 bgcolor=#E9E9E9
| 25262 ||  || — || November 10, 1998 || Socorro || LINEAR || — || align=right | 4.3 km || 
|-id=263 bgcolor=#d6d6d6
| 25263 ||  || — || November 10, 1998 || Socorro || LINEAR || — || align=right | 17 km || 
|-id=264 bgcolor=#E9E9E9
| 25264 Erickeen ||  ||  || November 10, 1998 || Socorro || LINEAR || — || align=right | 4.7 km || 
|-id=265 bgcolor=#fefefe
| 25265 ||  || — || November 10, 1998 || Socorro || LINEAR || NYS || align=right | 2.3 km || 
|-id=266 bgcolor=#fefefe
| 25266 Taylorkinyon ||  ||  || November 10, 1998 || Socorro || LINEAR || MAS || align=right | 2.0 km || 
|-id=267 bgcolor=#E9E9E9
| 25267 ||  || — || November 10, 1998 || Socorro || LINEAR || PAD || align=right | 8.1 km || 
|-id=268 bgcolor=#d6d6d6
| 25268 ||  || — || November 10, 1998 || Socorro || LINEAR || EOS || align=right | 6.9 km || 
|-id=269 bgcolor=#fefefe
| 25269 ||  || — || November 10, 1998 || Socorro || LINEAR || NYS || align=right | 2.5 km || 
|-id=270 bgcolor=#d6d6d6
| 25270 ||  || — || November 10, 1998 || Socorro || LINEAR || HYG || align=right | 17 km || 
|-id=271 bgcolor=#d6d6d6
| 25271 ||  || — || November 10, 1998 || Socorro || LINEAR || EOS || align=right | 6.4 km || 
|-id=272 bgcolor=#E9E9E9
| 25272 ||  || — || November 14, 1998 || Reedy Creek || J. Broughton || — || align=right | 3.6 km || 
|-id=273 bgcolor=#d6d6d6
| 25273 Barrycarole ||  ||  || November 15, 1998 || Cocoa || I. P. Griffin || KOR || align=right | 5.3 km || 
|-id=274 bgcolor=#E9E9E9
| 25274 ||  || — || November 15, 1998 || Reedy Creek || J. Broughton || EUN || align=right | 5.3 km || 
|-id=275 bgcolor=#fefefe
| 25275 Jocelynbell ||  ||  || November 14, 1998 || Goodricke-Pigott || R. A. Tucker || V || align=right | 3.5 km || 
|-id=276 bgcolor=#d6d6d6
| 25276 Dimai ||  ||  || November 15, 1998 || Pianoro || V. Goretti || EOS || align=right | 5.1 km || 
|-id=277 bgcolor=#d6d6d6
| 25277 ||  || — || November 14, 1998 || Uenohara || N. Kawasato || K-2 || align=right | 3.4 km || 
|-id=278 bgcolor=#E9E9E9
| 25278 ||  || — || November 13, 1998 || Socorro || LINEAR || — || align=right | 3.8 km || 
|-id=279 bgcolor=#fefefe
| 25279 ||  || — || November 13, 1998 || Socorro || LINEAR || — || align=right | 3.0 km || 
|-id=280 bgcolor=#d6d6d6
| 25280 ||  || — || November 14, 1998 || Socorro || LINEAR || EOS || align=right | 6.4 km || 
|-id=281 bgcolor=#E9E9E9
| 25281 || 1998 WP || — || November 16, 1998 || High Point || D. K. Chesney || — || align=right | 13 km || 
|-id=282 bgcolor=#E9E9E9
| 25282 || 1998 WR || — || November 18, 1998 || Socorro || LINEAR || EUN || align=right | 7.7 km || 
|-id=283 bgcolor=#E9E9E9
| 25283 || 1998 WU || — || November 17, 1998 || Oizumi || T. Kobayashi || — || align=right | 5.0 km || 
|-id=284 bgcolor=#d6d6d6
| 25284 ||  || — || November 17, 1998 || Catalina || CSS || ALA || align=right | 9.6 km || 
|-id=285 bgcolor=#d6d6d6
| 25285 ||  || — || November 17, 1998 || Uenohara || N. Kawasato || KOR || align=right | 7.6 km || 
|-id=286 bgcolor=#E9E9E9
| 25286 ||  || — || November 18, 1998 || Kushiro || S. Ueda, H. Kaneda || — || align=right | 7.9 km || 
|-id=287 bgcolor=#E9E9E9
| 25287 ||  || — || November 28, 1998 || Višnjan Observatory || K. Korlević || — || align=right | 7.2 km || 
|-id=288 bgcolor=#d6d6d6
| 25288 ||  || — || November 21, 1998 || Socorro || LINEAR || — || align=right | 4.4 km || 
|-id=289 bgcolor=#d6d6d6
| 25289 ||  || — || November 21, 1998 || Socorro || LINEAR || KOR || align=right | 6.2 km || 
|-id=290 bgcolor=#E9E9E9
| 25290 Vibhuti ||  ||  || November 21, 1998 || Socorro || LINEAR || — || align=right | 3.6 km || 
|-id=291 bgcolor=#d6d6d6
| 25291 ||  || — || November 21, 1998 || Socorro || LINEAR || — || align=right | 7.2 km || 
|-id=292 bgcolor=#d6d6d6
| 25292 ||  || — || November 21, 1998 || Socorro || LINEAR || — || align=right | 9.7 km || 
|-id=293 bgcolor=#d6d6d6
| 25293 ||  || — || November 21, 1998 || Socorro || LINEAR || KOR || align=right | 5.1 km || 
|-id=294 bgcolor=#d6d6d6
| 25294 Johnlaberee ||  ||  || November 21, 1998 || Socorro || LINEAR || — || align=right | 7.3 km || 
|-id=295 bgcolor=#d6d6d6
| 25295 ||  || — || November 21, 1998 || Socorro || LINEAR || ALA || align=right | 15 km || 
|-id=296 bgcolor=#d6d6d6
| 25296 ||  || — || November 26, 1998 || Kashihara || F. Uto || THM || align=right | 9.4 km || 
|-id=297 bgcolor=#d6d6d6
| 25297 ||  || — || November 18, 1998 || Socorro || LINEAR || — || align=right | 6.8 km || 
|-id=298 bgcolor=#d6d6d6
| 25298 Fionapaine ||  ||  || November 18, 1998 || Socorro || LINEAR || KOR || align=right | 5.0 km || 
|-id=299 bgcolor=#E9E9E9
| 25299 ||  || — || November 18, 1998 || Socorro || LINEAR || — || align=right | 3.4 km || 
|-id=300 bgcolor=#E9E9E9
| 25300 Andyromine ||  ||  || November 18, 1998 || Socorro || LINEAR || XIZ || align=right | 4.0 km || 
|}

25301–25400 

|-bgcolor=#d6d6d6
| 25301 Ambrofogar ||  ||  || December 7, 1998 || San Marcello || M. Tombelli, A. Boattini || — || align=right | 5.8 km || 
|-id=302 bgcolor=#d6d6d6
| 25302 Niim ||  ||  || December 9, 1998 || Chichibu || N. Satō || EOS || align=right | 12 km || 
|-id=303 bgcolor=#d6d6d6
| 25303 ||  || — || December 8, 1998 || Caussols || ODAS || — || align=right | 15 km || 
|-id=304 bgcolor=#d6d6d6
| 25304 ||  || — || December 14, 1998 || Socorro || LINEAR || KOR || align=right | 4.4 km || 
|-id=305 bgcolor=#E9E9E9
| 25305 ||  || — || December 9, 1998 || Socorro || LINEAR || — || align=right | 3.3 km || 
|-id=306 bgcolor=#d6d6d6
| 25306 ||  || — || December 14, 1998 || Socorro || LINEAR || — || align=right | 21 km || 
|-id=307 bgcolor=#d6d6d6
| 25307 ||  || — || December 15, 1998 || Socorro || LINEAR || — || align=right | 6.8 km || 
|-id=308 bgcolor=#d6d6d6
| 25308 ||  || — || December 15, 1998 || Socorro || LINEAR || EOS || align=right | 6.6 km || 
|-id=309 bgcolor=#fefefe
| 25309 Chrisauer ||  ||  || December 15, 1998 || Socorro || LINEAR || — || align=right | 3.6 km || 
|-id=310 bgcolor=#d6d6d6
| 25310 ||  || — || December 15, 1998 || Socorro || LINEAR || — || align=right | 15 km || 
|-id=311 bgcolor=#d6d6d6
| 25311 ||  || — || December 17, 1998 || Ondřejov || T. Rezek, P. Pravec || — || align=right | 6.8 km || 
|-id=312 bgcolor=#d6d6d6
| 25312 Asiapossenti ||  ||  || December 22, 1998 || Colleverde || V. S. Casulli || — || align=right | 18 km || 
|-id=313 bgcolor=#E9E9E9
| 25313 ||  || — || December 22, 1998 || Xinglong || SCAP || — || align=right | 5.9 km || 
|-id=314 bgcolor=#E9E9E9
| 25314 ||  || — || January 8, 1999 || Socorro || LINEAR || — || align=right | 8.4 km || 
|-id=315 bgcolor=#E9E9E9
| 25315 ||  || — || January 9, 1999 || Xinglong || SCAP || — || align=right | 3.4 km || 
|-id=316 bgcolor=#E9E9E9
| 25316 Comnick ||  ||  || January 10, 1999 || Anderson Mesa || LONEOS || — || align=right | 7.9 km || 
|-id=317 bgcolor=#fefefe
| 25317 ||  || — || January 24, 1999 || Črni Vrh || Črni Vrh || — || align=right | 4.6 km || 
|-id=318 bgcolor=#fefefe
| 25318 ||  || — || February 12, 1999 || Socorro || LINEAR || H || align=right | 2.1 km || 
|-id=319 bgcolor=#fefefe
| 25319 ||  || — || February 15, 1999 || Višnjan Observatory || K. Korlević || — || align=right | 7.5 km || 
|-id=320 bgcolor=#fefefe
| 25320 ||  || — || February 11, 1999 || Socorro || LINEAR || H || align=right | 2.4 km || 
|-id=321 bgcolor=#fefefe
| 25321 Rohitsingh ||  ||  || March 19, 1999 || Socorro || LINEAR || — || align=right | 6.4 km || 
|-id=322 bgcolor=#fefefe
| 25322 Rebeccajean ||  ||  || March 19, 1999 || Socorro || LINEAR || — || align=right | 3.0 km || 
|-id=323 bgcolor=#fefefe
| 25323 ||  || — || March 19, 1999 || Socorro || LINEAR || — || align=right | 2.5 km || 
|-id=324 bgcolor=#d6d6d6
| 25324 ||  || — || April 10, 1999 || Višnjan Observatory || K. Korlević || — || align=right | 8.3 km || 
|-id=325 bgcolor=#fefefe
| 25325 ||  || — || May 10, 1999 || Socorro || LINEAR || H || align=right | 3.0 km || 
|-id=326 bgcolor=#d6d6d6
| 25326 Lawrencesun ||  ||  || May 10, 1999 || Socorro || LINEAR || KOR || align=right | 3.8 km || 
|-id=327 bgcolor=#fefefe
| 25327 ||  || — || May 10, 1999 || Socorro || LINEAR || — || align=right | 4.4 km || 
|-id=328 bgcolor=#fefefe
| 25328 ||  || — || May 12, 1999 || Socorro || LINEAR || — || align=right | 3.5 km || 
|-id=329 bgcolor=#E9E9E9
| 25329 ||  || — || May 12, 1999 || Socorro || LINEAR || — || align=right | 3.9 km || 
|-id=330 bgcolor=#FFC2E0
| 25330 ||  || — || May 17, 1999 || Catalina || CSS || APO +1km || align=right | 3.2 km || 
|-id=331 bgcolor=#E9E9E9
| 25331 Berrevoets ||  ||  || May 20, 1999 || Oaxaca || J. M. Roe || — || align=right | 6.5 km || 
|-id=332 bgcolor=#fefefe
| 25332 ||  || — || May 17, 1999 || Socorro || LINEAR || H || align=right | 3.3 km || 
|-id=333 bgcolor=#fefefe
| 25333 Britwenger ||  ||  || May 18, 1999 || Socorro || LINEAR || FLO || align=right | 2.4 km || 
|-id=334 bgcolor=#E9E9E9
| 25334 ||  || — || June 8, 1999 || Socorro || LINEAR || — || align=right | 4.3 km || 
|-id=335 bgcolor=#fefefe
| 25335 || 1999 NT || — || July 9, 1999 || Les Tardieux Obs. || M. Boeuf || — || align=right | 4.7 km || 
|-id=336 bgcolor=#fefefe
| 25336 ||  || — || July 22, 1999 || Socorro || LINEAR || — || align=right | 4.2 km || 
|-id=337 bgcolor=#fefefe
| 25337 Elisabetta || 1999 PK ||  || August 6, 1999 || Ceccano || G. Masi || H || align=right | 1.5 km || 
|-id=338 bgcolor=#fefefe
| 25338 ||  || — || September 6, 1999 || Fountain Hills || C. W. Juels || — || align=right | 4.6 km || 
|-id=339 bgcolor=#fefefe
| 25339 ||  || — || September 7, 1999 || Socorro || LINEAR || H || align=right | 1.7 km || 
|-id=340 bgcolor=#fefefe
| 25340 Segoves ||  ||  || September 10, 1999 || Kleť || M. Tichý, Z. Moravec || H || align=right | 1.3 km || 
|-id=341 bgcolor=#fefefe
| 25341 ||  || — || September 13, 1999 || Višnjan Observatory || K. Korlević || — || align=right | 2.2 km || 
|-id=342 bgcolor=#E9E9E9
| 25342 ||  || — || September 14, 1999 || Višnjan Observatory || K. Korlević || EUN || align=right | 4.8 km || 
|-id=343 bgcolor=#fefefe
| 25343 ||  || — || September 15, 1999 || Višnjan Observatory || K. Korlević || FLO || align=right | 3.8 km || 
|-id=344 bgcolor=#C2FFFF
| 25344 ||  || — || September 7, 1999 || Socorro || LINEAR || L5 || align=right | 23 km || 
|-id=345 bgcolor=#fefefe
| 25345 ||  || — || September 7, 1999 || Socorro || LINEAR || — || align=right | 1.8 km || 
|-id=346 bgcolor=#E9E9E9
| 25346 ||  || — || September 8, 1999 || Socorro || LINEAR || — || align=right | 5.3 km || 
|-id=347 bgcolor=#C2FFFF
| 25347 ||  || — || September 9, 1999 || Socorro || LINEAR || L5 || align=right | 29 km || 
|-id=348 bgcolor=#fefefe
| 25348 Wisniowiecki ||  ||  || September 9, 1999 || Socorro || LINEAR || — || align=right | 2.6 km || 
|-id=349 bgcolor=#E9E9E9
| 25349 ||  || — || September 9, 1999 || Socorro || LINEAR || — || align=right | 5.6 km || 
|-id=350 bgcolor=#fefefe
| 25350 ||  || — || September 9, 1999 || Socorro || LINEAR || — || align=right | 1.6 km || 
|-id=351 bgcolor=#fefefe
| 25351 ||  || — || September 9, 1999 || Socorro || LINEAR || — || align=right | 3.4 km || 
|-id=352 bgcolor=#E9E9E9
| 25352 ||  || — || September 8, 1999 || Socorro || LINEAR || EUN || align=right | 3.5 km || 
|-id=353 bgcolor=#fefefe
| 25353 ||  || — || September 8, 1999 || Socorro || LINEAR || — || align=right | 2.5 km || 
|-id=354 bgcolor=#fefefe
| 25354 Zdasiuk ||  ||  || September 8, 1999 || Socorro || LINEAR || FLO || align=right | 2.6 km || 
|-id=355 bgcolor=#fefefe
| 25355 ||  || — || September 5, 1999 || Catalina || CSS || — || align=right | 2.8 km || 
|-id=356 bgcolor=#d6d6d6
| 25356 ||  || — || September 30, 1999 || Socorro || LINEAR || 629 || align=right | 7.7 km || 
|-id=357 bgcolor=#fefefe
| 25357 || 1999 TM || — || October 1, 1999 || Zeno || T. Stafford || — || align=right | 4.9 km || 
|-id=358 bgcolor=#fefefe
| 25358 Boskovice ||  ||  || October 2, 1999 || Ondřejov || L. Kotková || — || align=right | 2.2 km || 
|-id=359 bgcolor=#fefefe
| 25359 ||  || — || October 10, 1999 || Višnjan Observatory || K. Korlević, M. Jurić || FLO || align=right | 2.2 km || 
|-id=360 bgcolor=#fefefe
| 25360 ||  || — || October 10, 1999 || Višnjan Observatory || K. Korlević, M. Jurić || NYS || align=right | 3.2 km || 
|-id=361 bgcolor=#fefefe
| 25361 ||  || — || October 3, 1999 || Kitt Peak || Spacewatch || MAS || align=right | 3.0 km || 
|-id=362 bgcolor=#FA8072
| 25362 ||  || — || October 4, 1999 || Kitt Peak || Spacewatch || — || align=right | 2.7 km || 
|-id=363 bgcolor=#fefefe
| 25363 ||  || — || October 2, 1999 || Socorro || LINEAR || NYS || align=right | 1.8 km || 
|-id=364 bgcolor=#fefefe
| 25364 Allisonbaas ||  ||  || October 3, 1999 || Socorro || LINEAR || — || align=right | 3.0 km || 
|-id=365 bgcolor=#fefefe
| 25365 Bernreuter ||  ||  || October 3, 1999 || Socorro || LINEAR || — || align=right | 4.8 km || 
|-id=366 bgcolor=#fefefe
| 25366 Maureenbobo ||  ||  || October 4, 1999 || Socorro || LINEAR || NYS || align=right | 2.6 km || 
|-id=367 bgcolor=#fefefe
| 25367 Cicek ||  ||  || October 2, 1999 || Socorro || LINEAR || — || align=right | 5.2 km || 
|-id=368 bgcolor=#fefefe
| 25368 Gailcolwell ||  ||  || October 2, 1999 || Socorro || LINEAR || — || align=right | 2.7 km || 
|-id=369 bgcolor=#fefefe
| 25369 Dawndonovan ||  ||  || October 4, 1999 || Socorro || LINEAR || FLO || align=right | 2.1 km || 
|-id=370 bgcolor=#E9E9E9
| 25370 Karenfletch ||  ||  || October 7, 1999 || Socorro || LINEAR || — || align=right | 3.4 km || 
|-id=371 bgcolor=#fefefe
| 25371 Frangaley ||  ||  || October 7, 1999 || Socorro || LINEAR || — || align=right | 2.2 km || 
|-id=372 bgcolor=#fefefe
| 25372 Shanagarza ||  ||  || October 9, 1999 || Socorro || LINEAR || V || align=right | 2.0 km || 
|-id=373 bgcolor=#fefefe
| 25373 Gorsch ||  ||  || October 10, 1999 || Socorro || LINEAR || — || align=right | 2.3 km || 
|-id=374 bgcolor=#fefefe
| 25374 Harbrucker ||  ||  || October 10, 1999 || Socorro || LINEAR || — || align=right | 3.0 km || 
|-id=375 bgcolor=#fefefe
| 25375 Treenajoi ||  ||  || October 10, 1999 || Socorro || LINEAR || — || align=right | 2.6 km || 
|-id=376 bgcolor=#fefefe
| 25376 Christikeen ||  ||  || October 10, 1999 || Socorro || LINEAR || NYS || align=right | 5.7 km || 
|-id=377 bgcolor=#fefefe
| 25377 Rolaberee ||  ||  || October 12, 1999 || Socorro || LINEAR || — || align=right | 2.5 km || 
|-id=378 bgcolor=#fefefe
| 25378 Erinlambert ||  ||  || October 12, 1999 || Socorro || LINEAR || — || align=right | 2.9 km || 
|-id=379 bgcolor=#E9E9E9
| 25379 ||  || — || October 14, 1999 || Socorro || LINEAR || — || align=right | 5.8 km || 
|-id=380 bgcolor=#fefefe
| 25380 ||  || — || October 15, 1999 || Socorro || LINEAR || — || align=right | 1.5 km || 
|-id=381 bgcolor=#fefefe
| 25381 Jerrynelson ||  ||  || October 15, 1999 || Socorro || LINEAR || ERI || align=right | 4.3 km || 
|-id=382 bgcolor=#fefefe
| 25382 ||  || — || October 3, 1999 || Kitt Peak || Spacewatch || FLO || align=right | 1.9 km || 
|-id=383 bgcolor=#fefefe
| 25383 Lindacker ||  ||  || October 18, 1999 || Kleť || Kleť Obs. || NYS || align=right | 2.0 km || 
|-id=384 bgcolor=#d6d6d6
| 25384 Partizánske ||  ||  || October 18, 1999 || Ondřejov || P. Kušnirák || — || align=right | 10 km || 
|-id=385 bgcolor=#E9E9E9
| 25385 ||  || — || October 20, 1999 || Gekko || T. Kagawa || — || align=right | 6.2 km || 
|-id=386 bgcolor=#fefefe
| 25386 ||  || — || October 17, 1999 || Bergisch Gladbach || W. Bickel || — || align=right | 2.7 km || 
|-id=387 bgcolor=#fefefe
| 25387 ||  || — || October 16, 1999 || Višnjan Observatory || K. Korlević || V || align=right | 2.2 km || 
|-id=388 bgcolor=#fefefe
| 25388 ||  || — || October 31, 1999 || Oaxaca || J. M. Roe || NYS || align=right | 3.3 km || 
|-id=389 bgcolor=#E9E9E9
| 25389 ||  || — || October 29, 1999 || Catalina || CSS || — || align=right | 3.3 km || 
|-id=390 bgcolor=#E9E9E9
| 25390 ||  || — || October 31, 1999 || Socorro || LINEAR || GAL || align=right | 4.7 km || 
|-id=391 bgcolor=#fefefe
| 25391 ||  || — || October 29, 1999 || Catalina || CSS || FLO || align=right | 3.4 km || 
|-id=392 bgcolor=#fefefe
| 25392 ||  || — || October 30, 1999 || Catalina || CSS || — || align=right | 2.4 km || 
|-id=393 bgcolor=#fefefe
| 25393 ||  || — || October 30, 1999 || Catalina || CSS || — || align=right | 2.6 km || 
|-id=394 bgcolor=#fefefe
| 25394 ||  || — || October 30, 1999 || Catalina || CSS || — || align=right | 2.3 km || 
|-id=395 bgcolor=#fefefe
| 25395 ||  || — || November 5, 1999 || Oizumi || T. Kobayashi || FLO || align=right | 3.3 km || 
|-id=396 bgcolor=#fefefe
| 25396 ||  || — || November 9, 1999 || Oizumi || T. Kobayashi || — || align=right | 3.5 km || 
|-id=397 bgcolor=#fefefe
| 25397 ||  || — || November 7, 1999 || Gnosca || S. Sposetti || FLO || align=right | 2.2 km || 
|-id=398 bgcolor=#E9E9E9
| 25398 ||  || — || November 11, 1999 || Fountain Hills || C. W. Juels || — || align=right | 5.6 km || 
|-id=399 bgcolor=#E9E9E9
| 25399 Vonnegut ||  ||  || November 11, 1999 || Fountain Hills || C. W. Juels || HNS || align=right | 6.8 km || 
|-id=400 bgcolor=#fefefe
| 25400 ||  || — || November 9, 1999 || Nachi-Katsuura || Y. Shimizu, T. Urata || FLO || align=right | 3.6 km || 
|}

25401–25500 

|-bgcolor=#E9E9E9
| 25401 ||  || — || November 13, 1999 || Oizumi || T. Kobayashi || — || align=right | 4.3 km || 
|-id=402 bgcolor=#fefefe
| 25402 Angelanorse ||  ||  || November 3, 1999 || Socorro || LINEAR || — || align=right | 2.8 km || 
|-id=403 bgcolor=#fefefe
| 25403 Carlapiazza ||  ||  || November 3, 1999 || Socorro || LINEAR || — || align=right | 2.8 km || 
|-id=404 bgcolor=#fefefe
| 25404 Shansample ||  ||  || November 3, 1999 || Socorro || LINEAR || — || align=right | 2.7 km || 
|-id=405 bgcolor=#fefefe
| 25405 Jeffwidder ||  ||  || November 3, 1999 || Socorro || LINEAR || NYS || align=right | 2.0 km || 
|-id=406 bgcolor=#fefefe
| 25406 Debwysocki ||  ||  || November 3, 1999 || Socorro || LINEAR || — || align=right | 2.8 km || 
|-id=407 bgcolor=#E9E9E9
| 25407 ||  || — || November 3, 1999 || Socorro || LINEAR || EUN || align=right | 4.9 km || 
|-id=408 bgcolor=#E9E9E9
| 25408 ||  || — || November 3, 1999 || Socorro || LINEAR || — || align=right | 3.1 km || 
|-id=409 bgcolor=#E9E9E9
| 25409 ||  || — || November 3, 1999 || Socorro || LINEAR || — || align=right | 8.5 km || 
|-id=410 bgcolor=#fefefe
| 25410 Abejar ||  ||  || November 3, 1999 || Socorro || LINEAR || — || align=right | 2.5 km || 
|-id=411 bgcolor=#fefefe
| 25411 ||  || — || November 3, 1999 || Socorro || LINEAR || — || align=right | 4.4 km || 
|-id=412 bgcolor=#fefefe
| 25412 Arbesfeld ||  ||  || November 10, 1999 || Socorro || LINEAR || — || align=right | 3.0 km || 
|-id=413 bgcolor=#fefefe
| 25413 Dorischen ||  ||  || November 10, 1999 || Socorro || LINEAR || — || align=right | 2.9 km || 
|-id=414 bgcolor=#E9E9E9
| 25414 Cherkassky ||  ||  || November 3, 1999 || Socorro || LINEAR || — || align=right | 3.7 km || 
|-id=415 bgcolor=#fefefe
| 25415 Jocelyn ||  ||  || November 3, 1999 || Socorro || LINEAR || — || align=right | 3.1 km || 
|-id=416 bgcolor=#fefefe
| 25416 Chyanwen ||  ||  || November 4, 1999 || Socorro || LINEAR || — || align=right | 2.6 km || 
|-id=417 bgcolor=#fefefe
| 25417 Coquillette ||  ||  || November 4, 1999 || Socorro || LINEAR || — || align=right | 2.5 km || 
|-id=418 bgcolor=#fefefe
| 25418 Deshmukh ||  ||  || November 4, 1999 || Socorro || LINEAR || NYS || align=right | 1.8 km || 
|-id=419 bgcolor=#fefefe
| 25419 ||  || — || November 11, 1999 || Xinglong || SCAP || FLO || align=right | 2.9 km || 
|-id=420 bgcolor=#E9E9E9
| 25420 ||  || — || November 5, 1999 || Socorro || LINEAR || — || align=right | 2.6 km || 
|-id=421 bgcolor=#fefefe
| 25421 Gafaran ||  ||  || November 5, 1999 || Socorro || LINEAR || — || align=right | 2.4 km || 
|-id=422 bgcolor=#fefefe
| 25422 Abigreene ||  ||  || November 9, 1999 || Socorro || LINEAR || — || align=right | 2.6 km || 
|-id=423 bgcolor=#fefefe
| 25423 ||  || — || November 9, 1999 || Kitt Peak || Spacewatch || — || align=right | 1.7 km || 
|-id=424 bgcolor=#E9E9E9
| 25424 Gunasekaran ||  ||  || November 14, 1999 || Socorro || LINEAR || — || align=right | 2.6 km || 
|-id=425 bgcolor=#E9E9E9
| 25425 Chelsealynn ||  ||  || November 14, 1999 || Socorro || LINEAR || — || align=right | 2.6 km || 
|-id=426 bgcolor=#fefefe
| 25426 Alexanderkim ||  ||  || November 14, 1999 || Socorro || LINEAR || — || align=right | 1.9 km || 
|-id=427 bgcolor=#fefefe
| 25427 Kratchmarov ||  ||  || November 14, 1999 || Socorro || LINEAR || — || align=right | 4.6 km || 
|-id=428 bgcolor=#fefefe
| 25428 Lakhanpal ||  ||  || November 14, 1999 || Socorro || LINEAR || — || align=right | 2.4 km || 
|-id=429 bgcolor=#fefefe
| 25429 ||  || — || November 15, 1999 || Socorro || LINEAR || — || align=right | 2.9 km || 
|-id=430 bgcolor=#fefefe
| 25430 Ericlarson ||  ||  || November 15, 1999 || Socorro || LINEAR || FLO || align=right | 3.3 km || 
|-id=431 bgcolor=#fefefe
| 25431 ||  || — || November 2, 1999 || Catalina || CSS || — || align=right | 1.8 km || 
|-id=432 bgcolor=#fefefe
| 25432 Josepherli ||  ||  || November 5, 1999 || Socorro || LINEAR || V || align=right | 1.5 km || 
|-id=433 bgcolor=#fefefe
| 25433 ||  || — || November 26, 1999 || Višnjan Observatory || K. Korlević || — || align=right | 2.7 km || 
|-id=434 bgcolor=#fefefe
| 25434 Westonia ||  ||  || November 29, 1999 || Kleť || M. Tichý || — || align=right | 2.2 km || 
|-id=435 bgcolor=#fefefe
| 25435 ||  || — || November 28, 1999 || Oizumi || T. Kobayashi || — || align=right | 2.9 km || 
|-id=436 bgcolor=#fefefe
| 25436 ||  || — || November 28, 1999 || Oizumi || T. Kobayashi || — || align=right | 4.4 km || 
|-id=437 bgcolor=#fefefe
| 25437 ||  || — || November 28, 1999 || Oizumi || T. Kobayashi || V || align=right | 3.3 km || 
|-id=438 bgcolor=#fefefe
| 25438 ||  || — || November 30, 1999 || Socorro || LINEAR || PHO || align=right | 3.9 km || 
|-id=439 bgcolor=#E9E9E9
| 25439 ||  || — || November 28, 1999 || Višnjan Observatory || K. Korlević || — || align=right | 2.7 km || 
|-id=440 bgcolor=#fefefe
| 25440 ||  || — || November 28, 1999 || Višnjan Observatory || K. Korlević || — || align=right | 3.1 km || 
|-id=441 bgcolor=#fefefe
| 25441 ||  || — || November 28, 1999 || Kvistaberg || UDAS || NYS || align=right | 2.7 km || 
|-id=442 bgcolor=#E9E9E9
| 25442 ||  || — || November 30, 1999 || Oizumi || T. Kobayashi || — || align=right | 9.0 km || 
|-id=443 bgcolor=#d6d6d6
| 25443 ||  || — || November 30, 1999 || Oizumi || T. Kobayashi || — || align=right | 8.4 km || 
|-id=444 bgcolor=#fefefe
| 25444 ||  || — || November 29, 1999 || Višnjan Observatory || K. Korlević || — || align=right | 2.5 km || 
|-id=445 bgcolor=#E9E9E9
| 25445 ||  || — || December 2, 1999 || Oizumi || T. Kobayashi || — || align=right | 3.9 km || 
|-id=446 bgcolor=#fefefe
| 25446 ||  || — || December 4, 1999 || Gekko || T. Kagawa || — || align=right | 2.3 km || 
|-id=447 bgcolor=#fefefe
| 25447 ||  || — || December 4, 1999 || Catalina || CSS || NYS || align=right | 1.7 km || 
|-id=448 bgcolor=#fefefe
| 25448 ||  || — || December 4, 1999 || Catalina || CSS || NYS || align=right | 2.2 km || 
|-id=449 bgcolor=#E9E9E9
| 25449 ||  || — || December 4, 1999 || Catalina || CSS || — || align=right | 2.9 km || 
|-id=450 bgcolor=#fefefe
| 25450 ||  || — || December 4, 1999 || Fountain Hills || C. W. Juels || — || align=right | 4.1 km || 
|-id=451 bgcolor=#fefefe
| 25451 ||  || — || December 3, 1999 || Oizumi || T. Kobayashi || — || align=right | 4.8 km || 
|-id=452 bgcolor=#fefefe
| 25452 ||  || — || December 5, 1999 || Catalina || CSS || V || align=right | 1.6 km || 
|-id=453 bgcolor=#d6d6d6
| 25453 ||  || — || December 6, 1999 || Catalina || CSS || — || align=right | 15 km || 
|-id=454 bgcolor=#fefefe
| 25454 ||  || — || December 5, 1999 || Socorro || LINEAR || — || align=right | 4.6 km || 
|-id=455 bgcolor=#fefefe
| 25455 Anissamak ||  ||  || December 5, 1999 || Socorro || LINEAR || — || align=right | 3.1 km || 
|-id=456 bgcolor=#fefefe
| 25456 Caitlinmann ||  ||  || December 5, 1999 || Socorro || LINEAR || — || align=right | 3.3 km || 
|-id=457 bgcolor=#E9E9E9
| 25457 Mariannamao ||  ||  || December 5, 1999 || Socorro || LINEAR || PAE || align=right | 6.0 km || 
|-id=458 bgcolor=#fefefe
| 25458 ||  || — || December 5, 1999 || Socorro || LINEAR || — || align=right | 3.7 km || 
|-id=459 bgcolor=#d6d6d6
| 25459 ||  || — || December 5, 1999 || Socorro || LINEAR || EOS || align=right | 8.6 km || 
|-id=460 bgcolor=#fefefe
| 25460 ||  || — || December 6, 1999 || Višnjan Observatory || K. Korlević || — || align=right | 2.5 km || 
|-id=461 bgcolor=#E9E9E9
| 25461 ||  || — || December 3, 1999 || Socorro || LINEAR || — || align=right | 4.8 km || 
|-id=462 bgcolor=#fefefe
| 25462 Haydenmetsky ||  ||  || December 3, 1999 || Socorro || LINEAR || — || align=right | 3.0 km || 
|-id=463 bgcolor=#E9E9E9
| 25463 ||  || — || December 5, 1999 || Socorro || LINEAR || — || align=right | 5.2 km || 
|-id=464 bgcolor=#fefefe
| 25464 Maxrabinovich ||  ||  || December 6, 1999 || Socorro || LINEAR || FLO || align=right | 2.8 km || 
|-id=465 bgcolor=#fefefe
| 25465 Rajagopalan ||  ||  || December 6, 1999 || Socorro || LINEAR || — || align=right | 2.5 km || 
|-id=466 bgcolor=#E9E9E9
| 25466 ||  || — || December 6, 1999 || Socorro || LINEAR || — || align=right | 7.4 km || 
|-id=467 bgcolor=#E9E9E9
| 25467 ||  || — || December 6, 1999 || Socorro || LINEAR || ADE || align=right | 11 km || 
|-id=468 bgcolor=#fefefe
| 25468 Ramakrishna ||  ||  || December 6, 1999 || Socorro || LINEAR || V || align=right | 3.1 km || 
|-id=469 bgcolor=#fefefe
| 25469 Ransohoff ||  ||  || December 6, 1999 || Socorro || LINEAR || V || align=right | 3.7 km || 
|-id=470 bgcolor=#E9E9E9
| 25470 ||  || — || December 6, 1999 || Ametlla de Mar || J. Nomen || — || align=right | 5.3 km || 
|-id=471 bgcolor=#E9E9E9
| 25471 ||  || — || December 6, 1999 || Oizumi || T. Kobayashi || — || align=right | 3.2 km || 
|-id=472 bgcolor=#E9E9E9
| 25472 Joanoro ||  ||  || December 6, 1999 || Ametlla de Mar || J. Nomen || — || align=right | 4.0 km || 
|-id=473 bgcolor=#fefefe
| 25473 ||  || — || December 3, 1999 || Uenohara || N. Kawasato || — || align=right | 2.6 km || 
|-id=474 bgcolor=#E9E9E9
| 25474 ||  || — || December 8, 1999 || Socorro || LINEAR || — || align=right | 3.8 km || 
|-id=475 bgcolor=#E9E9E9
| 25475 Lizrao ||  ||  || December 7, 1999 || Socorro || LINEAR || — || align=right | 6.2 km || 
|-id=476 bgcolor=#fefefe
| 25476 Sealfon ||  ||  || December 7, 1999 || Socorro || LINEAR || — || align=right | 2.4 km || 
|-id=477 bgcolor=#fefefe
| 25477 Preyashah ||  ||  || December 7, 1999 || Socorro || LINEAR || — || align=right | 1.7 km || 
|-id=478 bgcolor=#fefefe
| 25478 Shrock ||  ||  || December 7, 1999 || Socorro || LINEAR || FLO || align=right | 1.9 km || 
|-id=479 bgcolor=#fefefe
| 25479 Ericshyu ||  ||  || December 7, 1999 || Socorro || LINEAR || — || align=right | 2.6 km || 
|-id=480 bgcolor=#E9E9E9
| 25480 ||  || — || December 7, 1999 || Socorro || LINEAR || ADE || align=right | 7.6 km || 
|-id=481 bgcolor=#fefefe
| 25481 Willjaysun ||  ||  || December 7, 1999 || Socorro || LINEAR || FLO || align=right | 2.3 km || 
|-id=482 bgcolor=#E9E9E9
| 25482 Tallapragada ||  ||  || December 7, 1999 || Socorro || LINEAR || — || align=right | 3.3 km || 
|-id=483 bgcolor=#fefefe
| 25483 Trusheim ||  ||  || December 7, 1999 || Socorro || LINEAR || — || align=right | 2.7 km || 
|-id=484 bgcolor=#fefefe
| 25484 ||  || — || December 7, 1999 || Socorro || LINEAR || — || align=right | 2.1 km || 
|-id=485 bgcolor=#d6d6d6
| 25485 ||  || — || December 7, 1999 || Socorro || LINEAR || — || align=right | 8.8 km || 
|-id=486 bgcolor=#E9E9E9
| 25486 Michaelwham ||  ||  || December 7, 1999 || Socorro || LINEAR || — || align=right | 2.4 km || 
|-id=487 bgcolor=#E9E9E9
| 25487 ||  || — || December 7, 1999 || Socorro || LINEAR || GEF || align=right | 4.8 km || 
|-id=488 bgcolor=#E9E9E9
| 25488 Figueiredo ||  ||  || December 7, 1999 || Socorro || LINEAR || — || align=right | 3.5 km || 
|-id=489 bgcolor=#E9E9E9
| 25489 ||  || — || December 7, 1999 || Socorro || LINEAR || EUN || align=right | 5.4 km || 
|-id=490 bgcolor=#fefefe
| 25490 Kevinkelly ||  ||  || December 7, 1999 || Socorro || LINEAR || NYS || align=right | 6.6 km || 
|-id=491 bgcolor=#E9E9E9
| 25491 Meador ||  ||  || December 7, 1999 || Socorro || LINEAR || — || align=right | 5.0 km || 
|-id=492 bgcolor=#fefefe
| 25492 Firnberg ||  ||  || December 7, 1999 || Socorro || LINEAR || — || align=right | 5.2 km || 
|-id=493 bgcolor=#E9E9E9
| 25493 ||  || — || December 7, 1999 || Socorro || LINEAR || — || align=right | 8.1 km || 
|-id=494 bgcolor=#E9E9E9
| 25494 ||  || — || December 7, 1999 || Socorro || LINEAR || — || align=right | 6.4 km || 
|-id=495 bgcolor=#E9E9E9
| 25495 Michaelroddy ||  ||  || December 7, 1999 || Socorro || LINEAR || — || align=right | 4.2 km || 
|-id=496 bgcolor=#E9E9E9
| 25496 ||  || — || December 7, 1999 || Socorro || LINEAR || EUN || align=right | 5.8 km || 
|-id=497 bgcolor=#E9E9E9
| 25497 Brauerman ||  ||  || December 7, 1999 || Socorro || LINEAR || — || align=right | 3.9 km || 
|-id=498 bgcolor=#d6d6d6
| 25498 ||  || — || December 7, 1999 || Socorro || LINEAR || — || align=right | 8.0 km || 
|-id=499 bgcolor=#fefefe
| 25499 ||  || — || December 7, 1999 || Socorro || LINEAR || V || align=right | 2.8 km || 
|-id=500 bgcolor=#d6d6d6
| 25500 ||  || — || December 7, 1999 || Socorro || LINEAR || THM || align=right | 8.3 km || 
|}

25501–25600 

|-bgcolor=#fefefe
| 25501 ||  || — || December 7, 1999 || Socorro || LINEAR || — || align=right | 1.9 km || 
|-id=502 bgcolor=#d6d6d6
| 25502 ||  || — || December 7, 1999 || Socorro || LINEAR || EOS || align=right | 6.0 km || 
|-id=503 bgcolor=#E9E9E9
| 25503 ||  || — || December 7, 1999 || Socorro || LINEAR || — || align=right | 5.5 km || 
|-id=504 bgcolor=#d6d6d6
| 25504 ||  || — || December 7, 1999 || Socorro || LINEAR || — || align=right | 10 km || 
|-id=505 bgcolor=#fefefe
| 25505 ||  || — || December 7, 1999 || Oizumi || T. Kobayashi || slow || align=right | 5.6 km || 
|-id=506 bgcolor=#E9E9E9
| 25506 ||  || — || December 9, 1999 || Oizumi || T. Kobayashi || DOR || align=right | 8.4 km || 
|-id=507 bgcolor=#fefefe
| 25507 ||  || — || December 9, 1999 || Oizumi || T. Kobayashi || — || align=right | 2.7 km || 
|-id=508 bgcolor=#fefefe
| 25508 ||  || — || December 9, 1999 || Oizumi || T. Kobayashi || V || align=right | 2.4 km || 
|-id=509 bgcolor=#fefefe
| 25509 Rodwong ||  ||  || December 7, 1999 || Socorro || LINEAR || NYS || align=right | 6.3 km || 
|-id=510 bgcolor=#fefefe
| 25510 Donvincent ||  ||  || December 7, 1999 || Socorro || LINEAR || V || align=right | 2.3 km || 
|-id=511 bgcolor=#fefefe
| 25511 Annlipinsky ||  ||  || December 7, 1999 || Socorro || LINEAR || — || align=right | 2.7 km || 
|-id=512 bgcolor=#fefefe
| 25512 Anncomins ||  ||  || December 7, 1999 || Socorro || LINEAR || slow || align=right | 3.6 km || 
|-id=513 bgcolor=#fefefe
| 25513 Weseley ||  ||  || December 7, 1999 || Socorro || LINEAR || — || align=right | 3.8 km || 
|-id=514 bgcolor=#E9E9E9
| 25514 Lisawu ||  ||  || December 7, 1999 || Socorro || LINEAR || — || align=right | 4.2 km || 
|-id=515 bgcolor=#fefefe
| 25515 Briancarey ||  ||  || December 7, 1999 || Socorro || LINEAR || — || align=right | 2.8 km || 
|-id=516 bgcolor=#fefefe
| 25516 Davidknight ||  ||  || December 7, 1999 || Socorro || LINEAR || NYS || align=right | 2.5 km || 
|-id=517 bgcolor=#fefefe
| 25517 Davidlau ||  ||  || December 7, 1999 || Socorro || LINEAR || — || align=right | 3.5 km || 
|-id=518 bgcolor=#E9E9E9
| 25518 Paulcitrin ||  ||  || December 7, 1999 || Socorro || LINEAR || PAD || align=right | 6.9 km || 
|-id=519 bgcolor=#fefefe
| 25519 Bartolomeo ||  ||  || December 7, 1999 || Socorro || LINEAR || — || align=right | 3.0 km || 
|-id=520 bgcolor=#fefefe
| 25520 Deronchang ||  ||  || December 7, 1999 || Socorro || LINEAR || V || align=right | 2.5 km || 
|-id=521 bgcolor=#fefefe
| 25521 Stevemorgan ||  ||  || December 7, 1999 || Socorro || LINEAR || — || align=right | 4.4 km || 
|-id=522 bgcolor=#E9E9E9
| 25522 Roisen ||  ||  || December 7, 1999 || Socorro || LINEAR || — || align=right | 4.9 km || 
|-id=523 bgcolor=#E9E9E9
| 25523 ||  || — || December 10, 1999 || Oizumi || T. Kobayashi || — || align=right | 3.6 km || 
|-id=524 bgcolor=#E9E9E9
| 25524 ||  || — || December 11, 1999 || Oizumi || T. Kobayashi || GEF || align=right | 4.3 km || 
|-id=525 bgcolor=#E9E9E9
| 25525 ||  || — || December 11, 1999 || Socorro || LINEAR || EUN || align=right | 5.1 km || 
|-id=526 bgcolor=#fefefe
| 25526 ||  || — || December 5, 1999 || Catalina || CSS || — || align=right | 2.5 km || 
|-id=527 bgcolor=#E9E9E9
| 25527 ||  || — || December 5, 1999 || Catalina || CSS || — || align=right | 3.8 km || 
|-id=528 bgcolor=#E9E9E9
| 25528 ||  || — || December 7, 1999 || Catalina || CSS || — || align=right | 7.9 km || 
|-id=529 bgcolor=#E9E9E9
| 25529 ||  || — || December 11, 1999 || Fountain Hills || C. W. Juels || — || align=right | 7.8 km || 
|-id=530 bgcolor=#fefefe
| 25530 ||  || — || December 6, 1999 || Višnjan Observatory || K. Korlević || FLO || align=right | 2.4 km || 
|-id=531 bgcolor=#fefefe
| 25531 Lessek ||  ||  || December 12, 1999 || Socorro || LINEAR || — || align=right | 3.6 km || 
|-id=532 bgcolor=#E9E9E9
| 25532 ||  || — || December 12, 1999 || Socorro || LINEAR || EUN || align=right | 6.2 km || 
|-id=533 bgcolor=#E9E9E9
| 25533 ||  || — || December 2, 1999 || Kitt Peak || Spacewatch || — || align=right | 3.1 km || 
|-id=534 bgcolor=#d6d6d6
| 25534 ||  || — || December 2, 1999 || Kitt Peak || Spacewatch || — || align=right | 7.9 km || 
|-id=535 bgcolor=#E9E9E9
| 25535 ||  || — || December 15, 1999 || Fountain Hills || C. W. Juels || slow || align=right | 7.0 km || 
|-id=536 bgcolor=#E9E9E9
| 25536 ||  || — || December 15, 1999 || Fountain Hills || C. W. Juels || HNS || align=right | 5.5 km || 
|-id=537 bgcolor=#fefefe
| 25537 ||  || — || December 8, 1999 || Socorro || LINEAR || — || align=right | 3.6 km || 
|-id=538 bgcolor=#E9E9E9
| 25538 Markcarlson ||  ||  || December 8, 1999 || Socorro || LINEAR || — || align=right | 3.6 km || 
|-id=539 bgcolor=#E9E9E9
| 25539 Roberthelm ||  ||  || December 8, 1999 || Socorro || LINEAR || — || align=right | 5.1 km || 
|-id=540 bgcolor=#fefefe
| 25540 ||  || — || December 8, 1999 || Socorro || LINEAR || V || align=right | 3.0 km || 
|-id=541 bgcolor=#d6d6d6
| 25541 Greathouse ||  ||  || December 8, 1999 || Socorro || LINEAR || — || align=right | 4.3 km || 
|-id=542 bgcolor=#fefefe
| 25542 Garabedian ||  ||  || December 8, 1999 || Socorro || LINEAR || — || align=right | 2.7 km || 
|-id=543 bgcolor=#d6d6d6
| 25543 Fruen ||  ||  || December 8, 1999 || Socorro || LINEAR || EOS || align=right | 5.6 km || 
|-id=544 bgcolor=#fefefe
| 25544 Renerogers ||  ||  || December 13, 1999 || Socorro || LINEAR || FLO || align=right | 2.3 km || 
|-id=545 bgcolor=#E9E9E9
| 25545 ||  || — || December 8, 1999 || Socorro || LINEAR || EUN || align=right | 4.8 km || 
|-id=546 bgcolor=#fefefe
| 25546 ||  || — || December 8, 1999 || Socorro || LINEAR || — || align=right | 4.1 km || 
|-id=547 bgcolor=#E9E9E9
| 25547 ||  || — || December 8, 1999 || Socorro || LINEAR || — || align=right | 3.9 km || 
|-id=548 bgcolor=#E9E9E9
| 25548 ||  || — || December 8, 1999 || Socorro || LINEAR || MAR || align=right | 4.6 km || 
|-id=549 bgcolor=#fefefe
| 25549 Jonsauer ||  ||  || December 10, 1999 || Socorro || LINEAR || fast || align=right | 5.1 km || 
|-id=550 bgcolor=#fefefe
| 25550 ||  || — || December 10, 1999 || Socorro || LINEAR || FLO || align=right | 2.7 km || 
|-id=551 bgcolor=#fefefe
| 25551 Drewhall ||  ||  || December 10, 1999 || Socorro || LINEAR || — || align=right | 3.2 km || 
|-id=552 bgcolor=#fefefe
| 25552 Gaster ||  ||  || December 10, 1999 || Socorro || LINEAR || V || align=right | 2.5 km || 
|-id=553 bgcolor=#E9E9E9
| 25553 Ivanlafer ||  ||  || December 10, 1999 || Socorro || LINEAR || — || align=right | 3.5 km || 
|-id=554 bgcolor=#fefefe
| 25554 Jayaranjan ||  ||  || December 10, 1999 || Socorro || LINEAR || NYS || align=right | 2.8 km || 
|-id=555 bgcolor=#E9E9E9
| 25555 Ratnavarma ||  ||  || December 10, 1999 || Socorro || LINEAR || — || align=right | 6.2 km || 
|-id=556 bgcolor=#E9E9E9
| 25556 ||  || — || December 10, 1999 || Socorro || LINEAR || — || align=right | 3.2 km || 
|-id=557 bgcolor=#E9E9E9
| 25557 ||  || — || December 10, 1999 || Socorro || LINEAR || EUN || align=right | 4.1 km || 
|-id=558 bgcolor=#E9E9E9
| 25558 ||  || — || December 10, 1999 || Socorro || LINEAR || ADE || align=right | 10 km || 
|-id=559 bgcolor=#d6d6d6
| 25559 ||  || — || December 10, 1999 || Socorro || LINEAR || URS || align=right | 12 km || 
|-id=560 bgcolor=#fefefe
| 25560 Chaihaoxi ||  ||  || December 10, 1999 || Socorro || LINEAR || — || align=right | 3.6 km || 
|-id=561 bgcolor=#E9E9E9
| 25561 Leehyunki ||  ||  || December 10, 1999 || Socorro || LINEAR || — || align=right | 6.0 km || 
|-id=562 bgcolor=#fefefe
| 25562 Limdarren ||  ||  || December 10, 1999 || Socorro || LINEAR || FLO || align=right | 3.1 km || 
|-id=563 bgcolor=#fefefe
| 25563 ||  || — || December 10, 1999 || Socorro || LINEAR || — || align=right | 3.5 km || 
|-id=564 bgcolor=#d6d6d6
| 25564 ||  || — || December 10, 1999 || Socorro || LINEAR || EOS || align=right | 5.8 km || 
|-id=565 bgcolor=#E9E9E9
| 25565 Lusiyang ||  ||  || December 10, 1999 || Socorro || LINEAR || — || align=right | 6.6 km || 
|-id=566 bgcolor=#E9E9E9
| 25566 Panying ||  ||  || December 10, 1999 || Socorro || LINEAR || — || align=right | 3.8 km || 
|-id=567 bgcolor=#fefefe
| 25567 ||  || — || December 10, 1999 || Socorro || LINEAR || — || align=right | 6.2 km || 
|-id=568 bgcolor=#E9E9E9
| 25568 ||  || — || December 10, 1999 || Socorro || LINEAR || MAR || align=right | 4.0 km || 
|-id=569 bgcolor=#E9E9E9
| 25569 ||  || — || December 12, 1999 || Socorro || LINEAR || — || align=right | 4.3 km || 
|-id=570 bgcolor=#fefefe
| 25570 Kesun ||  ||  || December 12, 1999 || Socorro || LINEAR || V || align=right | 2.1 km || 
|-id=571 bgcolor=#E9E9E9
| 25571 ||  || — || December 12, 1999 || Socorro || LINEAR || — || align=right | 5.1 km || 
|-id=572 bgcolor=#E9E9E9
| 25572 ||  || — || December 12, 1999 || Socorro || LINEAR || HNS || align=right | 6.1 km || 
|-id=573 bgcolor=#E9E9E9
| 25573 Wanghaoyu ||  ||  || December 12, 1999 || Socorro || LINEAR || — || align=right | 3.8 km || 
|-id=574 bgcolor=#E9E9E9
| 25574 ||  || — || December 12, 1999 || Socorro || LINEAR || — || align=right | 5.9 km || 
|-id=575 bgcolor=#E9E9E9
| 25575 ||  || — || December 12, 1999 || Socorro || LINEAR || — || align=right | 7.5 km || 
|-id=576 bgcolor=#fefefe
| 25576 ||  || — || December 14, 1999 || Socorro || LINEAR || — || align=right | 2.7 km || 
|-id=577 bgcolor=#fefefe
| 25577 Wangmanqiang ||  ||  || December 14, 1999 || Socorro || LINEAR || — || align=right | 2.8 km || 
|-id=578 bgcolor=#d6d6d6
| 25578 ||  || — || December 13, 1999 || Kitt Peak || Spacewatch || KOR || align=right | 3.5 km || 
|-id=579 bgcolor=#d6d6d6
| 25579 ||  || — || December 13, 1999 || Kitt Peak || Spacewatch || THM || align=right | 8.8 km || 
|-id=580 bgcolor=#E9E9E9
| 25580 Xuelai ||  ||  || December 14, 1999 || Socorro || LINEAR || — || align=right | 5.1 km || 
|-id=581 bgcolor=#E9E9E9
| 25581 ||  || — || December 14, 1999 || Socorro || LINEAR || — || align=right | 8.6 km || 
|-id=582 bgcolor=#d6d6d6
| 25582 ||  || — || December 14, 1999 || Socorro || LINEAR || — || align=right | 11 km || 
|-id=583 bgcolor=#d6d6d6
| 25583 ||  || — || December 14, 1999 || Socorro || LINEAR || EOS || align=right | 12 km || 
|-id=584 bgcolor=#E9E9E9
| 25584 Zhangnelson ||  ||  || December 15, 1999 || Socorro || LINEAR || — || align=right | 4.0 km || 
|-id=585 bgcolor=#d6d6d6
| 25585 ||  || — || December 13, 1999 || Kitt Peak || Spacewatch || THM || align=right | 6.5 km || 
|-id=586 bgcolor=#d6d6d6
| 25586 ||  || — || December 13, 1999 || Kitt Peak || Spacewatch || EOS || align=right | 5.8 km || 
|-id=587 bgcolor=#fefefe
| 25587 ||  || — || December 15, 1999 || Kitt Peak || Spacewatch || FLO || align=right | 2.4 km || 
|-id=588 bgcolor=#E9E9E9
| 25588 ||  || — || December 7, 1999 || Catalina || CSS || — || align=right | 4.4 km || 
|-id=589 bgcolor=#E9E9E9
| 25589 Danicamckellar ||  ||  || December 9, 1999 || Catalina || CSS || — || align=right | 4.8 km || 
|-id=590 bgcolor=#E9E9E9
| 25590 ||  || — || December 3, 1999 || Socorro || LINEAR || — || align=right | 8.1 km || 
|-id=591 bgcolor=#d6d6d6
| 25591 ||  || — || December 9, 1999 || Kitt Peak || Spacewatch || THM || align=right | 7.2 km || 
|-id=592 bgcolor=#fefefe
| 25592 ||  || — || December 19, 1999 || Moriyama || Y. Ikari || FLO || align=right | 3.2 km || 
|-id=593 bgcolor=#fefefe
| 25593 Camillejordan ||  ||  || December 28, 1999 || Prescott || P. G. Comba || NYS || align=right | 3.5 km || 
|-id=594 bgcolor=#d6d6d6
| 25594 Kessler ||  ||  || December 29, 1999 || Farpoint || G. Hug, G. Bell || EOS || align=right | 7.3 km || 
|-id=595 bgcolor=#E9E9E9
| 25595 ||  || — || December 29, 1999 || Farpoint || G. Hug, G. Bell || — || align=right | 3.3 km || 
|-id=596 bgcolor=#fefefe
| 25596 ||  || — || December 31, 1999 || Oizumi || T. Kobayashi || FLO || align=right | 2.7 km || 
|-id=597 bgcolor=#fefefe
| 25597 Glendahill ||  ||  || December 31, 1999 || Anderson Mesa || LONEOS || — || align=right | 2.9 km || 
|-id=598 bgcolor=#d6d6d6
| 25598 ||  || — || December 31, 1999 || Kitt Peak || Spacewatch || EOS || align=right | 7.7 km || 
|-id=599 bgcolor=#fefefe
| 25599 || 2000 AN || — || January 2, 2000 || Fountain Hills || C. W. Juels || FLO || align=right | 4.3 km || 
|-id=600 bgcolor=#fefefe
| 25600 ||  || — || January 2, 2000 || Višnjan Observatory || K. Korlević || — || align=right | 3.5 km || 
|}

25601–25700 

|-bgcolor=#d6d6d6
| 25601 Francopacini ||  ||  || January 1, 2000 || San Marcello || M. Tombelli, L. Tesi || THM || align=right | 8.2 km || 
|-id=602 bgcolor=#fefefe
| 25602 Ucaronia ||  ||  || January 2, 2000 || Pian dei Termini || A. Boattini, A. Caronia || V || align=right | 1.9 km || 
|-id=603 bgcolor=#E9E9E9
| 25603 ||  || — || January 2, 2000 || Višnjan Observatory || K. Korlević || — || align=right | 3.8 km || 
|-id=604 bgcolor=#d6d6d6
| 25604 Karlin ||  ||  || January 4, 2000 || Prescott || P. G. Comba || KOR || align=right | 4.4 km || 
|-id=605 bgcolor=#fefefe
| 25605 ||  || — || January 2, 2000 || Socorro || LINEAR || — || align=right | 2.0 km || 
|-id=606 bgcolor=#fefefe
| 25606 Chiangshenghao ||  ||  || January 2, 2000 || Socorro || LINEAR || V || align=right | 2.7 km || 
|-id=607 bgcolor=#fefefe
| 25607 Tsengiching ||  ||  || January 3, 2000 || Socorro || LINEAR || V || align=right | 2.1 km || 
|-id=608 bgcolor=#fefefe
| 25608 Hincapie ||  ||  || January 3, 2000 || Socorro || LINEAR || — || align=right | 2.4 km || 
|-id=609 bgcolor=#E9E9E9
| 25609 Bogantes ||  ||  || January 3, 2000 || Socorro || LINEAR || — || align=right | 3.4 km || 
|-id=610 bgcolor=#fefefe
| 25610 ||  || — || January 3, 2000 || Socorro || LINEAR || — || align=right | 3.0 km || 
|-id=611 bgcolor=#d6d6d6
| 25611 Mabellin ||  ||  || January 3, 2000 || Socorro || LINEAR || KOR || align=right | 3.6 km || 
|-id=612 bgcolor=#d6d6d6
| 25612 Yaoskalucia ||  ||  || January 3, 2000 || Socorro || LINEAR || THM || align=right | 6.7 km || 
|-id=613 bgcolor=#E9E9E9
| 25613 Bubenicek ||  ||  || January 3, 2000 || Socorro || LINEAR || — || align=right | 3.2 km || 
|-id=614 bgcolor=#d6d6d6
| 25614 Jankral ||  ||  || January 3, 2000 || Socorro || LINEAR || — || align=right | 7.0 km || 
|-id=615 bgcolor=#fefefe
| 25615 Votroubek ||  ||  || January 3, 2000 || Socorro || LINEAR || V || align=right | 3.1 km || 
|-id=616 bgcolor=#fefefe
| 25616 Riinuots ||  ||  || January 3, 2000 || Socorro || LINEAR || — || align=right | 3.1 km || 
|-id=617 bgcolor=#d6d6d6
| 25617 Thomasnesch ||  ||  || January 3, 2000 || Socorro || LINEAR || — || align=right | 7.3 km || 
|-id=618 bgcolor=#fefefe
| 25618 ||  || — || January 3, 2000 || Socorro || LINEAR || ERI || align=right | 8.8 km || 
|-id=619 bgcolor=#E9E9E9
| 25619 Martonspohn ||  ||  || January 3, 2000 || Socorro || LINEAR || — || align=right | 6.6 km || 
|-id=620 bgcolor=#fefefe
| 25620 Jayaprakash ||  ||  || January 3, 2000 || Socorro || LINEAR || — || align=right | 4.0 km || 
|-id=621 bgcolor=#E9E9E9
| 25621 ||  || — || January 3, 2000 || Socorro || LINEAR || — || align=right | 4.7 km || 
|-id=622 bgcolor=#d6d6d6
| 25622 ||  || — || January 3, 2000 || Socorro || LINEAR || — || align=right | 8.6 km || 
|-id=623 bgcolor=#fefefe
| 25623 ||  || — || January 4, 2000 || Socorro || LINEAR || — || align=right | 3.2 km || 
|-id=624 bgcolor=#d6d6d6
| 25624 Kronecker ||  ||  || January 6, 2000 || Prescott || P. G. Comba || — || align=right | 5.6 km || 
|-id=625 bgcolor=#fefefe
| 25625 Verdenet ||  ||  || January 5, 2000 || Le Creusot || J.-C. Merlin || EUT || align=right | 2.2 km || 
|-id=626 bgcolor=#fefefe
| 25626 ||  || — || January 5, 2000 || Višnjan Observatory || K. Korlević || NYSfast || align=right | 2.7 km || 
|-id=627 bgcolor=#d6d6d6
| 25627 ||  || — || January 5, 2000 || Fountain Hills || C. W. Juels || — || align=right | 5.1 km || 
|-id=628 bgcolor=#fefefe
| 25628 Kummer ||  ||  || January 7, 2000 || Prescott || P. G. Comba || — || align=right | 2.5 km || 
|-id=629 bgcolor=#fefefe
| 25629 Mukherjee ||  ||  || January 4, 2000 || Socorro || LINEAR || — || align=right | 2.6 km || 
|-id=630 bgcolor=#E9E9E9
| 25630 Sarkar ||  ||  || January 4, 2000 || Socorro || LINEAR || HOF || align=right | 6.6 km || 
|-id=631 bgcolor=#d6d6d6
| 25631 ||  || — || January 4, 2000 || Socorro || LINEAR || SAN || align=right | 6.8 km || 
|-id=632 bgcolor=#fefefe
| 25632 ||  || — || January 4, 2000 || Socorro || LINEAR || FLO || align=right | 4.1 km || 
|-id=633 bgcolor=#d6d6d6
| 25633 ||  || — || January 4, 2000 || Socorro || LINEAR || THM || align=right | 7.5 km || 
|-id=634 bgcolor=#d6d6d6
| 25634 ||  || — || January 4, 2000 || Socorro || LINEAR || — || align=right | 4.7 km || 
|-id=635 bgcolor=#E9E9E9
| 25635 ||  || — || January 4, 2000 || Socorro || LINEAR || — || align=right | 8.4 km || 
|-id=636 bgcolor=#d6d6d6
| 25636 Vaishnav ||  ||  || January 4, 2000 || Socorro || LINEAR || KOR || align=right | 3.2 km || 
|-id=637 bgcolor=#d6d6d6
| 25637 ||  || — || January 4, 2000 || Socorro || LINEAR || — || align=right | 8.5 km || 
|-id=638 bgcolor=#fefefe
| 25638 Ahissar ||  ||  || January 4, 2000 || Socorro || LINEAR || — || align=right | 2.8 km || 
|-id=639 bgcolor=#E9E9E9
| 25639 Fedina ||  ||  || January 4, 2000 || Socorro || LINEAR || — || align=right | 3.0 km || 
|-id=640 bgcolor=#d6d6d6
| 25640 Klintefelt ||  ||  || January 4, 2000 || Socorro || LINEAR || — || align=right | 3.6 km || 
|-id=641 bgcolor=#E9E9E9
| 25641 ||  || — || January 4, 2000 || Socorro || LINEAR || — || align=right | 4.0 km || 
|-id=642 bgcolor=#d6d6d6
| 25642 Adiseshan ||  ||  || January 4, 2000 || Socorro || LINEAR || CHA || align=right | 3.5 km || 
|-id=643 bgcolor=#E9E9E9
| 25643 ||  || — || January 5, 2000 || Socorro || LINEAR || — || align=right | 4.2 km || 
|-id=644 bgcolor=#fefefe
| 25644 ||  || — || January 5, 2000 || Socorro || LINEAR || — || align=right | 4.2 km || 
|-id=645 bgcolor=#fefefe
| 25645 Alexanderyan ||  ||  || January 5, 2000 || Socorro || LINEAR || V || align=right | 2.1 km || 
|-id=646 bgcolor=#fefefe
| 25646 Noniearora ||  ||  || January 5, 2000 || Socorro || LINEAR || — || align=right | 3.0 km || 
|-id=647 bgcolor=#fefefe
| 25647 ||  || — || January 5, 2000 || Socorro || LINEAR || — || align=right | 2.6 km || 
|-id=648 bgcolor=#E9E9E9
| 25648 Baghel ||  ||  || January 5, 2000 || Socorro || LINEAR || — || align=right | 2.6 km || 
|-id=649 bgcolor=#d6d6d6
| 25649 ||  || — || January 5, 2000 || Socorro || LINEAR || EOS || align=right | 7.4 km || 
|-id=650 bgcolor=#fefefe
| 25650 Shaubakshi ||  ||  || January 5, 2000 || Socorro || LINEAR || FLO || align=right | 2.6 km || 
|-id=651 bgcolor=#d6d6d6
| 25651 ||  || — || January 5, 2000 || Socorro || LINEAR || HYG || align=right | 9.0 km || 
|-id=652 bgcolor=#d6d6d6
| 25652 Maddieball ||  ||  || January 5, 2000 || Socorro || LINEAR || THM || align=right | 6.6 km || 
|-id=653 bgcolor=#d6d6d6
| 25653 Baskaran ||  ||  || January 5, 2000 || Socorro || LINEAR || KOR || align=right | 3.5 km || 
|-id=654 bgcolor=#E9E9E9
| 25654 ||  || — || January 5, 2000 || Socorro || LINEAR || — || align=right | 3.3 km || 
|-id=655 bgcolor=#fefefe
| 25655 Baupeter ||  ||  || January 5, 2000 || Socorro || LINEAR || FLO || align=right | 2.7 km || 
|-id=656 bgcolor=#d6d6d6
| 25656 Bejnood ||  ||  || January 5, 2000 || Socorro || LINEAR || — || align=right | 4.1 km || 
|-id=657 bgcolor=#d6d6d6
| 25657 Berkowitz ||  ||  || January 5, 2000 || Socorro || LINEAR || — || align=right | 8.0 km || 
|-id=658 bgcolor=#fefefe
| 25658 Bokor ||  ||  || January 5, 2000 || Socorro || LINEAR || — || align=right | 3.3 km || 
|-id=659 bgcolor=#fefefe
| 25659 Liboynton ||  ||  || January 5, 2000 || Socorro || LINEAR || NYS || align=right | 2.2 km || 
|-id=660 bgcolor=#fefefe
| 25660 ||  || — || January 5, 2000 || Socorro || LINEAR || — || align=right | 4.8 km || 
|-id=661 bgcolor=#d6d6d6
| 25661 ||  || — || January 5, 2000 || Socorro || LINEAR || EOS || align=right | 5.6 km || 
|-id=662 bgcolor=#E9E9E9
| 25662 Chonofsky ||  ||  || January 5, 2000 || Socorro || LINEAR || HEN || align=right | 4.2 km || 
|-id=663 bgcolor=#fefefe
| 25663 Nickmycroft ||  ||  || January 5, 2000 || Socorro || LINEAR || NYS || align=right | 2.3 km || 
|-id=664 bgcolor=#d6d6d6
| 25664 ||  || — || January 5, 2000 || Socorro || LINEAR || — || align=right | 8.6 km || 
|-id=665 bgcolor=#d6d6d6
| 25665 ||  || — || January 5, 2000 || Socorro || LINEAR || — || align=right | 9.6 km || 
|-id=666 bgcolor=#E9E9E9
| 25666 ||  || — || January 5, 2000 || Socorro || LINEAR || GEF || align=right | 5.0 km || 
|-id=667 bgcolor=#d6d6d6
| 25667 ||  || — || January 5, 2000 || Socorro || LINEAR || — || align=right | 7.5 km || 
|-id=668 bgcolor=#d6d6d6
| 25668 ||  || — || January 4, 2000 || Socorro || LINEAR || THM || align=right | 7.9 km || 
|-id=669 bgcolor=#E9E9E9
| 25669 Kristinrose ||  ||  || January 4, 2000 || Socorro || LINEAR || — || align=right | 3.1 km || 
|-id=670 bgcolor=#d6d6d6
| 25670 Densley ||  ||  || January 4, 2000 || Socorro || LINEAR || KOR || align=right | 3.5 km || 
|-id=671 bgcolor=#d6d6d6
| 25671 ||  || — || January 4, 2000 || Socorro || LINEAR || KOR || align=right | 5.0 km || 
|-id=672 bgcolor=#d6d6d6
| 25672 ||  || — || January 4, 2000 || Socorro || LINEAR || EOS || align=right | 6.5 km || 
|-id=673 bgcolor=#d6d6d6
| 25673 Di Mascio ||  ||  || January 5, 2000 || Socorro || LINEAR || — || align=right | 4.2 km || 
|-id=674 bgcolor=#fefefe
| 25674 Kevinellis ||  ||  || January 5, 2000 || Socorro || LINEAR || — || align=right | 2.9 km || 
|-id=675 bgcolor=#E9E9E9
| 25675 ||  || — || January 5, 2000 || Socorro || LINEAR || — || align=right | 5.0 km || 
|-id=676 bgcolor=#fefefe
| 25676 Jesseellison ||  ||  || January 5, 2000 || Socorro || LINEAR || V || align=right | 2.1 km || 
|-id=677 bgcolor=#fefefe
| 25677 Aaronenten ||  ||  || January 5, 2000 || Socorro || LINEAR || — || align=right | 2.3 km || 
|-id=678 bgcolor=#fefefe
| 25678 Ericfoss ||  ||  || January 5, 2000 || Socorro || LINEAR || V || align=right | 2.4 km || 
|-id=679 bgcolor=#fefefe
| 25679 Andrewguo ||  ||  || January 5, 2000 || Socorro || LINEAR || V || align=right | 2.8 km || 
|-id=680 bgcolor=#fefefe
| 25680 Walterhansen ||  ||  || January 5, 2000 || Socorro || LINEAR || V || align=right | 2.2 km || 
|-id=681 bgcolor=#d6d6d6
| 25681 ||  || — || January 5, 2000 || Socorro || LINEAR || — || align=right | 12 km || 
|-id=682 bgcolor=#fefefe
| 25682 ||  || — || January 5, 2000 || Socorro || LINEAR || — || align=right | 3.4 km || 
|-id=683 bgcolor=#d6d6d6
| 25683 Haochenhong ||  ||  || January 5, 2000 || Socorro || LINEAR || — || align=right | 8.4 km || 
|-id=684 bgcolor=#E9E9E9
| 25684 ||  || — || January 5, 2000 || Socorro || LINEAR || — || align=right | 4.3 km || 
|-id=685 bgcolor=#fefefe
| 25685 Katlinhornig ||  ||  || January 5, 2000 || Socorro || LINEAR || V || align=right | 3.0 km || 
|-id=686 bgcolor=#fefefe
| 25686 Stephoskins ||  ||  || January 5, 2000 || Socorro || LINEAR || — || align=right | 3.5 km || 
|-id=687 bgcolor=#E9E9E9
| 25687 ||  || — || January 5, 2000 || Socorro || LINEAR || — || align=right | 6.0 km || 
|-id=688 bgcolor=#d6d6d6
| 25688 Hritzo ||  ||  || January 5, 2000 || Socorro || LINEAR || — || align=right | 8.9 km || 
|-id=689 bgcolor=#fefefe
| 25689 Duannihuang ||  ||  || January 5, 2000 || Socorro || LINEAR || FLO || align=right | 3.1 km || 
|-id=690 bgcolor=#E9E9E9
| 25690 Iredale ||  ||  || January 5, 2000 || Socorro || LINEAR || — || align=right | 6.3 km || 
|-id=691 bgcolor=#E9E9E9
| 25691 ||  || — || January 5, 2000 || Socorro || LINEAR || — || align=right | 6.0 km || 
|-id=692 bgcolor=#d6d6d6
| 25692 ||  || — || January 5, 2000 || Socorro || LINEAR || — || align=right | 12 km || 
|-id=693 bgcolor=#fefefe
| 25693 Ishitani ||  ||  || January 5, 2000 || Socorro || LINEAR || NYS || align=right | 2.6 km || 
|-id=694 bgcolor=#E9E9E9
| 25694 ||  || — || January 5, 2000 || Socorro || LINEAR || — || align=right | 4.7 km || 
|-id=695 bgcolor=#d6d6d6
| 25695 Eileenjang ||  ||  || January 5, 2000 || Socorro || LINEAR || EOS || align=right | 4.8 km || 
|-id=696 bgcolor=#fefefe
| 25696 Kylejones ||  ||  || January 5, 2000 || Socorro || LINEAR || V || align=right | 2.6 km || 
|-id=697 bgcolor=#E9E9E9
| 25697 Kadiyala ||  ||  || January 5, 2000 || Socorro || LINEAR || — || align=right | 4.5 km || 
|-id=698 bgcolor=#fefefe
| 25698 Snehakannan ||  ||  || January 5, 2000 || Socorro || LINEAR || FLO || align=right | 2.7 km || 
|-id=699 bgcolor=#d6d6d6
| 25699 ||  || — || January 5, 2000 || Socorro || LINEAR || — || align=right | 19 km || 
|-id=700 bgcolor=#d6d6d6
| 25700 ||  || — || January 5, 2000 || Socorro || LINEAR || FIR || align=right | 16 km || 
|}

25701–25800 

|-bgcolor=#E9E9E9
| 25701 Alexkeeler ||  ||  || January 5, 2000 || Socorro || LINEAR || MRX || align=right | 4.0 km || 
|-id=702 bgcolor=#d6d6d6
| 25702 ||  || — || January 5, 2000 || Socorro || LINEAR || — || align=right | 11 km || 
|-id=703 bgcolor=#E9E9E9
| 25703 ||  || — || January 5, 2000 || Socorro || LINEAR || MAR || align=right | 6.7 km || 
|-id=704 bgcolor=#E9E9E9
| 25704 Kendrick ||  ||  || January 5, 2000 || Socorro || LINEAR || HOF || align=right | 7.7 km || 
|-id=705 bgcolor=#d6d6d6
| 25705 ||  || — || January 5, 2000 || Socorro || LINEAR || ALA || align=right | 13 km || 
|-id=706 bgcolor=#fefefe
| 25706 Cekoscielski ||  ||  || January 5, 2000 || Socorro || LINEAR || — || align=right | 2.4 km || 
|-id=707 bgcolor=#E9E9E9
| 25707 ||  || — || January 5, 2000 || Socorro || LINEAR || ADE || align=right | 7.7 km || 
|-id=708 bgcolor=#fefefe
| 25708 Vedantkumar ||  ||  || January 5, 2000 || Socorro || LINEAR || V || align=right | 2.3 km || 
|-id=709 bgcolor=#d6d6d6
| 25709 ||  || — || January 5, 2000 || Socorro || LINEAR || EOS || align=right | 7.2 km || 
|-id=710 bgcolor=#fefefe
| 25710 Petelandgren ||  ||  || January 8, 2000 || Socorro || LINEAR || — || align=right | 3.4 km || 
|-id=711 bgcolor=#fefefe
| 25711 Lebovits ||  ||  || January 8, 2000 || Socorro || LINEAR || NYS || align=right | 2.2 km || 
|-id=712 bgcolor=#d6d6d6
| 25712 ||  || — || January 3, 2000 || Socorro || LINEAR || THM || align=right | 8.4 km || 
|-id=713 bgcolor=#E9E9E9
| 25713 ||  || — || January 3, 2000 || Socorro || LINEAR || — || align=right | 4.4 km || 
|-id=714 bgcolor=#d6d6d6
| 25714 Aprillee ||  ||  || January 3, 2000 || Socorro || LINEAR || — || align=right | 5.3 km || 
|-id=715 bgcolor=#fefefe
| 25715 Lizmariemako ||  ||  || January 5, 2000 || Socorro || LINEAR || — || align=right | 2.7 km || 
|-id=716 bgcolor=#E9E9E9
| 25716 ||  || — || January 5, 2000 || Socorro || LINEAR || — || align=right | 4.2 km || 
|-id=717 bgcolor=#fefefe
| 25717 Ritikmal ||  ||  || January 7, 2000 || Socorro || LINEAR || — || align=right | 1.9 km || 
|-id=718 bgcolor=#fefefe
| 25718 ||  || — || January 7, 2000 || Socorro || LINEAR || — || align=right | 3.0 km || 
|-id=719 bgcolor=#d6d6d6
| 25719 ||  || — || January 7, 2000 || Socorro || LINEAR || — || align=right | 9.1 km || 
|-id=720 bgcolor=#fefefe
| 25720 Mallidi ||  ||  || January 7, 2000 || Socorro || LINEAR || V || align=right | 1.9 km || 
|-id=721 bgcolor=#fefefe
| 25721 Anartya ||  ||  || January 7, 2000 || Socorro || LINEAR || V || align=right | 2.0 km || 
|-id=722 bgcolor=#fefefe
| 25722 Evanmarshall ||  ||  || January 7, 2000 || Socorro || LINEAR || V || align=right | 3.0 km || 
|-id=723 bgcolor=#E9E9E9
| 25723 Shamascharak ||  ||  || January 7, 2000 || Socorro || LINEAR || GEF || align=right | 4.3 km || 
|-id=724 bgcolor=#E9E9E9
| 25724 ||  || — || January 7, 2000 || Socorro || LINEAR || EUN || align=right | 4.2 km || 
|-id=725 bgcolor=#fefefe
| 25725 McCormick ||  ||  || January 7, 2000 || Socorro || LINEAR || FLO || align=right | 2.5 km || 
|-id=726 bgcolor=#E9E9E9
| 25726 ||  || — || January 7, 2000 || Socorro || LINEAR || — || align=right | 9.8 km || 
|-id=727 bgcolor=#E9E9E9
| 25727 Karsonmiller ||  ||  || January 7, 2000 || Socorro || LINEAR || GEF || align=right | 4.5 km || 
|-id=728 bgcolor=#E9E9E9
| 25728 ||  || — || January 8, 2000 || Socorro || LINEAR || ADE || align=right | 4.9 km || 
|-id=729 bgcolor=#fefefe
| 25729 ||  || — || January 8, 2000 || Socorro || LINEAR || — || align=right | 4.6 km || 
|-id=730 bgcolor=#E9E9E9
| 25730 ||  || — || January 8, 2000 || Socorro || LINEAR || — || align=right | 7.3 km || 
|-id=731 bgcolor=#d6d6d6
| 25731 ||  || — || January 8, 2000 || Socorro || LINEAR || — || align=right | 14 km || 
|-id=732 bgcolor=#E9E9E9
| 25732 ||  || — || January 8, 2000 || Socorro || LINEAR || — || align=right | 5.5 km || 
|-id=733 bgcolor=#E9E9E9
| 25733 ||  || — || January 8, 2000 || Socorro || LINEAR || — || align=right | 4.9 km || 
|-id=734 bgcolor=#d6d6d6
| 25734 ||  || — || January 8, 2000 || Socorro || LINEAR || EOS || align=right | 6.7 km || 
|-id=735 bgcolor=#E9E9E9
| 25735 ||  || — || January 8, 2000 || Socorro || LINEAR || — || align=right | 4.9 km || 
|-id=736 bgcolor=#d6d6d6
| 25736 ||  || — || January 8, 2000 || Socorro || LINEAR || EOS || align=right | 7.4 km || 
|-id=737 bgcolor=#d6d6d6
| 25737 ||  || — || January 8, 2000 || Socorro || LINEAR || — || align=right | 5.2 km || 
|-id=738 bgcolor=#fefefe
| 25738 ||  || — || January 8, 2000 || Socorro || LINEAR || — || align=right | 4.8 km || 
|-id=739 bgcolor=#E9E9E9
| 25739 ||  || — || January 10, 2000 || Socorro || LINEAR || — || align=right | 5.7 km || 
|-id=740 bgcolor=#E9E9E9
| 25740 ||  || — || January 10, 2000 || Socorro || LINEAR || — || align=right | 5.3 km || 
|-id=741 bgcolor=#d6d6d6
| 25741 ||  || — || January 8, 2000 || Kitt Peak || Spacewatch || — || align=right | 13 km || 
|-id=742 bgcolor=#E9E9E9
| 25742 Amandablanco ||  ||  || January 7, 2000 || Anderson Mesa || LONEOS || — || align=right | 3.8 km || 
|-id=743 bgcolor=#d6d6d6
| 25743 Serrato ||  ||  || January 7, 2000 || Anderson Mesa || LONEOS || — || align=right | 18 km || 
|-id=744 bgcolor=#fefefe
| 25744 Surajmishra ||  ||  || January 5, 2000 || Socorro || LINEAR || FLO || align=right | 1.8 km || 
|-id=745 bgcolor=#d6d6d6
| 25745 Schimmelpenninck ||  ||  || January 7, 2000 || Anderson Mesa || LONEOS || — || align=right | 7.7 km || 
|-id=746 bgcolor=#d6d6d6
| 25746 Nickscoville ||  ||  || January 7, 2000 || Anderson Mesa || LONEOS || — || align=right | 6.8 km || 
|-id=747 bgcolor=#E9E9E9
| 25747 Nicerasmus ||  ||  || January 7, 2000 || Anderson Mesa || LONEOS || EUN || align=right | 5.1 km || 
|-id=748 bgcolor=#d6d6d6
| 25748 ||  || — || January 7, 2000 || Socorro || LINEAR || — || align=right | 15 km || 
|-id=749 bgcolor=#d6d6d6
| 25749 ||  || — || January 27, 2000 || Oizumi || T. Kobayashi || THM || align=right | 11 km || 
|-id=750 bgcolor=#d6d6d6
| 25750 Miwnay ||  ||  || January 28, 2000 || Rock Finder || W. K. Y. Yeung || — || align=right | 7.1 km || 
|-id=751 bgcolor=#fefefe
| 25751 Mokshagundam ||  ||  || January 25, 2000 || Socorro || LINEAR || NYS || align=right | 2.9 km || 
|-id=752 bgcolor=#fefefe
| 25752 ||  || — || January 29, 2000 || Socorro || LINEAR || — || align=right | 2.7 km || 
|-id=753 bgcolor=#fefefe
| 25753 ||  || — || January 28, 2000 || Uenohara || N. Kawasato || — || align=right | 4.4 km || 
|-id=754 bgcolor=#d6d6d6
| 25754 ||  || — || January 28, 2000 || Oizumi || T. Kobayashi || — || align=right | 7.2 km || 
|-id=755 bgcolor=#d6d6d6
| 25755 ||  || — || January 28, 2000 || Oizumi || T. Kobayashi || EOS || align=right | 9.5 km || 
|-id=756 bgcolor=#d6d6d6
| 25756 ||  || — || January 30, 2000 || Socorro || LINEAR || TEL || align=right | 4.9 km || 
|-id=757 bgcolor=#E9E9E9
| 25757 ||  || — || January 26, 2000 || Kitt Peak || Spacewatch || — || align=right | 4.4 km || 
|-id=758 bgcolor=#d6d6d6
| 25758 ||  || — || January 30, 2000 || Socorro || LINEAR || THM || align=right | 9.3 km || 
|-id=759 bgcolor=#fefefe
| 25759 ||  || — || January 25, 2000 || Bergisch Gladbach || W. Bickel || NYS || align=right | 1.9 km || 
|-id=760 bgcolor=#E9E9E9
| 25760 Annaspitz ||  ||  || January 30, 2000 || Catalina || CSS || — || align=right | 4.0 km || 
|-id=761 bgcolor=#E9E9E9
| 25761 ||  || — || January 28, 2000 || Kitt Peak || Spacewatch || — || align=right | 3.7 km || 
|-id=762 bgcolor=#d6d6d6
| 25762 ||  || — || February 2, 2000 || Oizumi || T. Kobayashi || EOS || align=right | 7.4 km || 
|-id=763 bgcolor=#E9E9E9
| 25763 Naveenmurali ||  ||  || February 2, 2000 || Socorro || LINEAR || — || align=right | 2.9 km || 
|-id=764 bgcolor=#fefefe
| 25764 Divyanag ||  ||  || February 2, 2000 || Socorro || LINEAR || — || align=right | 2.3 km || 
|-id=765 bgcolor=#d6d6d6
| 25765 Heatherlynne ||  ||  || February 2, 2000 || Socorro || LINEAR || — || align=right | 4.0 km || 
|-id=766 bgcolor=#E9E9E9
| 25766 Nosarzewski ||  ||  || February 2, 2000 || Socorro || LINEAR || HEN || align=right | 2.5 km || 
|-id=767 bgcolor=#E9E9E9
| 25767 Stevennoyce ||  ||  || February 2, 2000 || Socorro || LINEAR || — || align=right | 4.5 km || 
|-id=768 bgcolor=#d6d6d6
| 25768 Nussbaum ||  ||  || February 2, 2000 || Socorro || LINEAR || KOR || align=right | 4.1 km || 
|-id=769 bgcolor=#fefefe
| 25769 Munaoli ||  ||  || February 2, 2000 || Socorro || LINEAR || — || align=right | 2.6 km || 
|-id=770 bgcolor=#E9E9E9
| 25770 ||  || — || February 2, 2000 || Socorro || LINEAR || — || align=right | 3.5 km || 
|-id=771 bgcolor=#d6d6d6
| 25771 ||  || — || February 2, 2000 || Socorro || LINEAR || 7:4 || align=right | 9.0 km || 
|-id=772 bgcolor=#E9E9E9
| 25772 Ashpatra ||  ||  || February 2, 2000 || Socorro || LINEAR || WIT || align=right | 4.4 km || 
|-id=773 bgcolor=#E9E9E9
| 25773 ||  || — || February 2, 2000 || Socorro || LINEAR || HOF || align=right | 11 km || 
|-id=774 bgcolor=#d6d6d6
| 25774 ||  || — || February 2, 2000 || Socorro || LINEAR || EOS || align=right | 7.2 km || 
|-id=775 bgcolor=#E9E9E9
| 25775 Danielpeng ||  ||  || February 2, 2000 || Socorro || LINEAR || MRX || align=right | 4.2 km || 
|-id=776 bgcolor=#d6d6d6
| 25776 ||  || — || February 2, 2000 || Socorro || LINEAR || — || align=right | 7.3 km || 
|-id=777 bgcolor=#d6d6d6
| 25777 ||  || — || February 4, 2000 || Višnjan Observatory || K. Korlević || HYG || align=right | 8.2 km || 
|-id=778 bgcolor=#d6d6d6
| 25778 Csere ||  ||  || February 4, 2000 || Ondřejov || P. Kušnirák || THM || align=right | 8.8 km || 
|-id=779 bgcolor=#fefefe
| 25779 ||  || — || February 2, 2000 || Socorro || LINEAR || — || align=right | 2.6 km || 
|-id=780 bgcolor=#fefefe
| 25780 ||  || — || February 3, 2000 || Socorro || LINEAR || NYS || align=right | 2.9 km || 
|-id=781 bgcolor=#E9E9E9
| 25781 Rajendra ||  ||  || February 3, 2000 || Socorro || LINEAR || — || align=right | 5.0 km || 
|-id=782 bgcolor=#fefefe
| 25782 ||  || — || February 3, 2000 || Socorro || LINEAR || MAS || align=right | 3.8 km || 
|-id=783 bgcolor=#E9E9E9
| 25783 Brandontyler ||  ||  || February 4, 2000 || Socorro || LINEAR || — || align=right | 5.2 km || 
|-id=784 bgcolor=#d6d6d6
| 25784 ||  || — || February 2, 2000 || Socorro || LINEAR || — || align=right | 6.3 km || 
|-id=785 bgcolor=#E9E9E9
| 25785 ||  || — || February 2, 2000 || Socorro || LINEAR || — || align=right | 8.8 km || 
|-id=786 bgcolor=#E9E9E9
| 25786 ||  || — || February 2, 2000 || Socorro || LINEAR || — || align=right | 3.7 km || 
|-id=787 bgcolor=#d6d6d6
| 25787 ||  || — || February 2, 2000 || Socorro || LINEAR || — || align=right | 7.7 km || 
|-id=788 bgcolor=#d6d6d6
| 25788 ||  || — || February 2, 2000 || Socorro || LINEAR || — || align=right | 7.3 km || 
|-id=789 bgcolor=#d6d6d6
| 25789 ||  || — || February 2, 2000 || Socorro || LINEAR || — || align=right | 17 km || 
|-id=790 bgcolor=#E9E9E9
| 25790 ||  || — || February 5, 2000 || Socorro || LINEAR || GEF || align=right | 6.0 km || 
|-id=791 bgcolor=#d6d6d6
| 25791 ||  || — || February 2, 2000 || Socorro || LINEAR || URS || align=right | 16 km || 
|-id=792 bgcolor=#d6d6d6
| 25792 ||  || — || February 2, 2000 || Socorro || LINEAR || 7:4 || align=right | 14 km || 
|-id=793 bgcolor=#d6d6d6
| 25793 Chrisanchez ||  ||  || February 4, 2000 || Socorro || LINEAR || KOR || align=right | 4.0 km || 
|-id=794 bgcolor=#d6d6d6
| 25794 ||  || — || February 7, 2000 || Socorro || LINEAR || — || align=right | 14 km || 
|-id=795 bgcolor=#E9E9E9
| 25795 ||  || — || February 8, 2000 || Kitt Peak || Spacewatch || — || align=right | 2.2 km || 
|-id=796 bgcolor=#d6d6d6
| 25796 ||  || — || February 4, 2000 || Socorro || LINEAR || — || align=right | 7.1 km || 
|-id=797 bgcolor=#d6d6d6
| 25797 ||  || — || February 4, 2000 || Socorro || LINEAR || 7:4 || align=right | 14 km || 
|-id=798 bgcolor=#E9E9E9
| 25798 Reneeschaaf ||  ||  || February 4, 2000 || Socorro || LINEAR || — || align=right | 4.1 km || 
|-id=799 bgcolor=#d6d6d6
| 25799 Anmaschlegel ||  ||  || February 4, 2000 || Socorro || LINEAR || KOR || align=right | 5.1 km || 
|-id=800 bgcolor=#d6d6d6
| 25800 Glukhovsky ||  ||  || February 4, 2000 || Socorro || LINEAR || SHU3:2 || align=right | 16 km || 
|}

25801–25900 

|-bgcolor=#d6d6d6
| 25801 Oliviaschwob ||  ||  || February 4, 2000 || Socorro || LINEAR || KOR || align=right | 4.2 km || 
|-id=802 bgcolor=#E9E9E9
| 25802 ||  || — || February 4, 2000 || Socorro || LINEAR || — || align=right | 4.1 km || 
|-id=803 bgcolor=#d6d6d6
| 25803 ||  || — || February 4, 2000 || Socorro || LINEAR || HYG || align=right | 8.1 km || 
|-id=804 bgcolor=#d6d6d6
| 25804 ||  || — || February 4, 2000 || Socorro || LINEAR || HYG || align=right | 12 km || 
|-id=805 bgcolor=#fefefe
| 25805 ||  || — || February 6, 2000 || Socorro || LINEAR || — || align=right | 3.9 km || 
|-id=806 bgcolor=#E9E9E9
| 25806 ||  || — || February 6, 2000 || Socorro || LINEAR || GEF || align=right | 4.5 km || 
|-id=807 bgcolor=#E9E9E9
| 25807 Baharshah ||  ||  || February 8, 2000 || Socorro || LINEAR || — || align=right | 7.1 km || 
|-id=808 bgcolor=#d6d6d6
| 25808 ||  || — || February 7, 2000 || Socorro || LINEAR || — || align=right | 12 km || 
|-id=809 bgcolor=#fefefe
| 25809 ||  || — || February 3, 2000 || Socorro || LINEAR || NYS || align=right | 2.3 km || 
|-id=810 bgcolor=#fefefe
| 25810 ||  || — || February 2, 2000 || Kitt Peak || Spacewatch || NYS || align=right | 2.3 km || 
|-id=811 bgcolor=#d6d6d6
| 25811 Richardteo ||  ||  || February 26, 2000 || Rock Finder || W. K. Y. Yeung || KOR || align=right | 3.5 km || 
|-id=812 bgcolor=#d6d6d6
| 25812 ||  || — || February 28, 2000 || Socorro || LINEAR || EOS || align=right | 5.8 km || 
|-id=813 bgcolor=#d6d6d6
| 25813 Savannahshaw ||  ||  || February 29, 2000 || Socorro || LINEAR || KOR || align=right | 3.5 km || 
|-id=814 bgcolor=#d6d6d6
| 25814 Preesinghal ||  ||  || February 29, 2000 || Socorro || LINEAR || KOR || align=right | 4.4 km || 
|-id=815 bgcolor=#E9E9E9
| 25815 Scottskirlo ||  ||  || February 29, 2000 || Socorro || LINEAR || — || align=right | 6.8 km || 
|-id=816 bgcolor=#E9E9E9
| 25816 ||  || — || February 29, 2000 || Socorro || LINEAR || HOF || align=right | 6.9 km || 
|-id=817 bgcolor=#d6d6d6
| 25817 Tahilramani ||  ||  || February 29, 2000 || Socorro || LINEAR || — || align=right | 6.3 km || 
|-id=818 bgcolor=#d6d6d6
| 25818 ||  || — || February 29, 2000 || Socorro || LINEAR || THM || align=right | 8.5 km || 
|-id=819 bgcolor=#d6d6d6
| 25819 Tripathi ||  ||  || February 29, 2000 || Socorro || LINEAR || THM || align=right | 9.4 km || 
|-id=820 bgcolor=#d6d6d6
| 25820 ||  || — || February 29, 2000 || Socorro || LINEAR || — || align=right | 12 km || 
|-id=821 bgcolor=#E9E9E9
| 25821 ||  || — || February 29, 2000 || Socorro || LINEAR || — || align=right | 4.0 km || 
|-id=822 bgcolor=#d6d6d6
| 25822 Carolinejune ||  ||  || February 29, 2000 || Socorro || LINEAR || — || align=right | 8.0 km || 
|-id=823 bgcolor=#d6d6d6
| 25823 Dentrujillo ||  ||  || February 29, 2000 || Socorro || LINEAR || — || align=right | 8.9 km || 
|-id=824 bgcolor=#d6d6d6
| 25824 Viviantsang ||  ||  || February 29, 2000 || Socorro || LINEAR || THM || align=right | 8.0 km || 
|-id=825 bgcolor=#d6d6d6
| 25825 ||  || — || February 29, 2000 || Socorro || LINEAR || — || align=right | 6.3 km || 
|-id=826 bgcolor=#d6d6d6
| 25826 ||  || — || February 28, 2000 || Socorro || LINEAR || HYG || align=right | 9.6 km || 
|-id=827 bgcolor=#d6d6d6
| 25827 ||  || — || February 28, 2000 || Socorro || LINEAR || — || align=right | 7.5 km || 
|-id=828 bgcolor=#d6d6d6
| 25828 ||  || — || February 29, 2000 || Socorro || LINEAR || VER || align=right | 12 km || 
|-id=829 bgcolor=#d6d6d6
| 25829 ||  || — || February 29, 2000 || Socorro || LINEAR || HYG || align=right | 11 km || 
|-id=830 bgcolor=#E9E9E9
| 25830 ||  || — || February 26, 2000 || Uccle || T. Pauwels || EUN || align=right | 3.7 km || 
|-id=831 bgcolor=#d6d6d6
| 25831 ||  || — || February 29, 2000 || Socorro || LINEAR || THM || align=right | 9.1 km || 
|-id=832 bgcolor=#d6d6d6
| 25832 Van Scoyoc ||  ||  || March 3, 2000 || Socorro || LINEAR || TEL || align=right | 3.2 km || 
|-id=833 bgcolor=#E9E9E9
| 25833 ||  || — || March 5, 2000 || Reedy Creek || J. Broughton || — || align=right | 4.5 km || 
|-id=834 bgcolor=#E9E9E9
| 25834 Vechinski ||  ||  || March 5, 2000 || Socorro || LINEAR || — || align=right | 4.6 km || 
|-id=835 bgcolor=#d6d6d6
| 25835 Tomzega ||  ||  || March 3, 2000 || Catalina || CSS || — || align=right | 12 km || 
|-id=836 bgcolor=#d6d6d6
| 25836 Harishvemuri ||  ||  || March 5, 2000 || Socorro || LINEAR || KOR || align=right | 4.1 km || 
|-id=837 bgcolor=#E9E9E9
| 25837 ||  || — || March 5, 2000 || Socorro || LINEAR || — || align=right | 5.9 km || 
|-id=838 bgcolor=#d6d6d6
| 25838 ||  || — || March 5, 2000 || Socorro || LINEAR || — || align=right | 6.0 km || 
|-id=839 bgcolor=#d6d6d6
| 25839 ||  || — || March 11, 2000 || Tebbutt || F. B. Zoltowski || — || align=right | 6.9 km || 
|-id=840 bgcolor=#d6d6d6
| 25840 ||  || — || March 8, 2000 || Socorro || LINEAR || VER || align=right | 10 km || 
|-id=841 bgcolor=#d6d6d6
| 25841 ||  || — || March 5, 2000 || Socorro || LINEAR || EOS || align=right | 6.7 km || 
|-id=842 bgcolor=#d6d6d6
| 25842 ||  || — || March 5, 2000 || Socorro || LINEAR || — || align=right | 19 km || 
|-id=843 bgcolor=#d6d6d6
| 25843 ||  || — || March 8, 2000 || Socorro || LINEAR || — || align=right | 15 km || 
|-id=844 bgcolor=#d6d6d6
| 25844 ||  || — || March 8, 2000 || Socorro || LINEAR || EOS || align=right | 8.5 km || 
|-id=845 bgcolor=#E9E9E9
| 25845 ||  || — || March 8, 2000 || Socorro || LINEAR || ADE || align=right | 9.9 km || 
|-id=846 bgcolor=#d6d6d6
| 25846 ||  || — || March 9, 2000 || Socorro || LINEAR || — || align=right | 14 km || 
|-id=847 bgcolor=#d6d6d6
| 25847 ||  || — || March 12, 2000 || Socorro || LINEAR || SYL7:4 || align=right | 15 km || 
|-id=848 bgcolor=#E9E9E9
| 25848 ||  || — || March 14, 2000 || Reedy Creek || J. Broughton || NEM || align=right | 6.0 km || 
|-id=849 bgcolor=#E9E9E9
| 25849 ||  || — || March 8, 2000 || Socorro || LINEAR || MAR || align=right | 5.3 km || 
|-id=850 bgcolor=#d6d6d6
| 25850 ||  || — || March 8, 2000 || Socorro || LINEAR || TIR || align=right | 7.8 km || 
|-id=851 bgcolor=#d6d6d6
| 25851 Browning ||  ||  || March 11, 2000 || Anderson Mesa || LONEOS || 7:4 || align=right | 15 km || 
|-id=852 bgcolor=#d6d6d6
| 25852 ||  || — || March 4, 2000 || Socorro || LINEAR || — || align=right | 8.9 km || 
|-id=853 bgcolor=#E9E9E9
| 25853 ||  || — || March 6, 2000 || Haleakala || NEAT || PAL || align=right | 7.4 km || 
|-id=854 bgcolor=#d6d6d6
| 25854 ||  || — || March 4, 2000 || Socorro || LINEAR || — || align=right | 14 km || 
|-id=855 bgcolor=#d6d6d6
| 25855 ||  || — || March 4, 2000 || Socorro || LINEAR || EMA || align=right | 12 km || 
|-id=856 bgcolor=#d6d6d6
| 25856 ||  || — || March 5, 2000 || Socorro || LINEAR || SYL7:4 || align=right | 16 km || 
|-id=857 bgcolor=#d6d6d6
| 25857 ||  || — || March 5, 2000 || Socorro || LINEAR || — || align=right | 5.8 km || 
|-id=858 bgcolor=#d6d6d6
| 25858 Donherbert ||  ||  || March 10, 2000 || Catalina || CSS || — || align=right | 8.3 km || 
|-id=859 bgcolor=#d6d6d6
| 25859 ||  || — || March 28, 2000 || Socorro || LINEAR || — || align=right | 15 km || 
|-id=860 bgcolor=#d6d6d6
| 25860 ||  || — || March 28, 2000 || Socorro || LINEAR || EOS || align=right | 8.9 km || 
|-id=861 bgcolor=#d6d6d6
| 25861 ||  || — || March 28, 2000 || Socorro || LINEAR || — || align=right | 8.9 km || 
|-id=862 bgcolor=#E9E9E9
| 25862 ||  || — || March 28, 2000 || Socorro || LINEAR || — || align=right | 5.2 km || 
|-id=863 bgcolor=#d6d6d6
| 25863 ||  || — || March 29, 2000 || Socorro || LINEAR || — || align=right | 11 km || 
|-id=864 bgcolor=#d6d6d6
| 25864 Banič ||  ||  || April 8, 2000 || Ondřejov || P. Kušnirák || — || align=right | 8.9 km || 
|-id=865 bgcolor=#E9E9E9
| 25865 ||  || — || April 2, 2000 || Socorro || LINEAR || EUN || align=right | 5.0 km || 
|-id=866 bgcolor=#d6d6d6
| 25866 ||  || — || April 7, 2000 || Socorro || LINEAR || slow || align=right | 7.3 km || 
|-id=867 bgcolor=#fefefe
| 25867 DeMuth ||  ||  || April 26, 2000 || Anderson Mesa || LONEOS || — || align=right | 2.7 km || 
|-id=868 bgcolor=#E9E9E9
| 25868 ||  || — || May 4, 2000 || Socorro || LINEAR || — || align=right | 4.5 km || 
|-id=869 bgcolor=#d6d6d6
| 25869 Jacoby ||  ||  || May 1, 2000 || Anderson Mesa || LONEOS || 3:2 || align=right | 23 km || 
|-id=870 bgcolor=#fefefe
| 25870 Panchovigil ||  ||  || May 28, 2000 || Socorro || LINEAR || NYS || align=right | 1.8 km || 
|-id=871 bgcolor=#E9E9E9
| 25871 ||  || — || June 11, 2000 || Valinhos || P. R. Holvorcem || EUN || align=right | 7.1 km || 
|-id=872 bgcolor=#FA8072
| 25872 ||  || — || June 25, 2000 || Socorro || LINEAR || — || align=right data-sort-value="0.78" | 780 m || 
|-id=873 bgcolor=#E9E9E9
| 25873 ||  || — || June 25, 2000 || Socorro || LINEAR || ADE || align=right | 6.9 km || 
|-id=874 bgcolor=#E9E9E9
| 25874 ||  || — || July 30, 2000 || Socorro || LINEAR || — || align=right | 4.0 km || 
|-id=875 bgcolor=#fefefe
| 25875 Wickramasekara ||  ||  || July 31, 2000 || Socorro || LINEAR || — || align=right | 3.6 km || 
|-id=876 bgcolor=#E9E9E9
| 25876 ||  || — || August 1, 2000 || Socorro || LINEAR || MIS || align=right | 5.1 km || 
|-id=877 bgcolor=#fefefe
| 25877 Katherinexue ||  ||  || August 24, 2000 || Socorro || LINEAR || NYS || align=right | 5.7 km || 
|-id=878 bgcolor=#fefefe
| 25878 Sihengyou ||  ||  || August 24, 2000 || Socorro || LINEAR || — || align=right | 1.6 km || 
|-id=879 bgcolor=#d6d6d6
| 25879 ||  || — || August 28, 2000 || Socorro || LINEAR || EOS || align=right | 8.6 km || 
|-id=880 bgcolor=#fefefe
| 25880 ||  || — || August 28, 2000 || Socorro || LINEAR || — || align=right | 3.3 km || 
|-id=881 bgcolor=#d6d6d6
| 25881 ||  || — || September 3, 2000 || Socorro || LINEAR || — || align=right | 11 km || 
|-id=882 bgcolor=#E9E9E9
| 25882 ||  || — || September 3, 2000 || Socorro || LINEAR || — || align=right | 3.5 km || 
|-id=883 bgcolor=#C2FFFF
| 25883 ||  || — || September 2, 2000 || Haleakala || NEAT || L5 || align=right | 30 km || 
|-id=884 bgcolor=#fefefe
| 25884 Asai ||  ||  || September 20, 2000 || Bisei SG Center || BATTeRS || H || align=right | 1.9 km || 
|-id=885 bgcolor=#E9E9E9
| 25885 Wiesinger ||  ||  || September 24, 2000 || Socorro || LINEAR || — || align=right | 3.0 km || 
|-id=886 bgcolor=#fefefe
| 25886 ||  || — || September 19, 2000 || Haleakala || NEAT || — || align=right | 7.1 km || 
|-id=887 bgcolor=#d6d6d6
| 25887 ||  || — || September 30, 2000 || Socorro || LINEAR || DUR || align=right | 9.3 km || 
|-id=888 bgcolor=#E9E9E9
| 25888 ||  || — || October 31, 2000 || Socorro || LINEAR || — || align=right | 12 km || 
|-id=889 bgcolor=#E9E9E9
| 25889 ||  || — || November 1, 2000 || Socorro || LINEAR || EUN || align=right | 5.4 km || 
|-id=890 bgcolor=#E9E9E9
| 25890 Louisburg ||  ||  || November 3, 2000 || Olathe || L. Robinson || — || align=right | 12 km || 
|-id=891 bgcolor=#E9E9E9
| 25891 ||  || — || November 20, 2000 || Fountain Hills || C. W. Juels || PAL || align=right | 9.1 km || 
|-id=892 bgcolor=#fefefe
| 25892 Funabashi ||  ||  || November 22, 2000 || Bisei SG Center || BATTeRS || H || align=right | 1.9 km || 
|-id=893 bgcolor=#d6d6d6
| 25893 Sugihara ||  ||  || November 19, 2000 || Desert Beaver || W. K. Y. Yeung || ALA || align=right | 14 km || 
|-id=894 bgcolor=#d6d6d6
| 25894 ||  || — || November 30, 2000 || Socorro || LINEAR || EOS || align=right | 5.8 km || 
|-id=895 bgcolor=#C2FFFF
| 25895 ||  || — || December 1, 2000 || Socorro || LINEAR || L4 || align=right | 33 km || 
|-id=896 bgcolor=#d6d6d6
| 25896 ||  || — || December 4, 2000 || Socorro || LINEAR || — || align=right | 7.2 km || 
|-id=897 bgcolor=#E9E9E9
| 25897 ||  || — || December 4, 2000 || Socorro || LINEAR || EUN || align=right | 5.3 km || 
|-id=898 bgcolor=#E9E9E9
| 25898 Alpoge ||  ||  || December 30, 2000 || Socorro || LINEAR || GEF || align=right | 4.3 km || 
|-id=899 bgcolor=#fefefe
| 25899 Namratanand ||  ||  || December 30, 2000 || Socorro || LINEAR || NYS || align=right | 5.6 km || 
|-id=900 bgcolor=#d6d6d6
| 25900 ||  || — || December 30, 2000 || Socorro || LINEAR || THM || align=right | 11 km || 
|}

25901–26000 

|-bgcolor=#fefefe
| 25901 Ericbrooks ||  ||  || December 30, 2000 || Socorro || LINEAR || MAS || align=right | 2.0 km || 
|-id=902 bgcolor=#E9E9E9
| 25902 ||  || — || December 28, 2000 || Socorro || LINEAR || HNS || align=right | 3.7 km || 
|-id=903 bgcolor=#E9E9E9
| 25903 Yuvalcalev ||  ||  || December 30, 2000 || Socorro || LINEAR || — || align=right | 2.5 km || 
|-id=904 bgcolor=#d6d6d6
| 25904 ||  || — || December 28, 2000 || Socorro || LINEAR || EMA || align=right | 7.6 km || 
|-id=905 bgcolor=#fefefe
| 25905 Clerico ||  ||  || December 31, 2000 || Anderson Mesa || LONEOS || — || align=right | 6.5 km || 
|-id=906 bgcolor=#d6d6d6
| 25906 Morrell ||  ||  || December 27, 2000 || Anderson Mesa || LONEOS || EUP || align=right | 11 km || 
|-id=907 bgcolor=#fefefe
| 25907 Capodilupo ||  ||  || January 3, 2001 || Socorro || LINEAR || V || align=right | 2.7 km || 
|-id=908 bgcolor=#E9E9E9
| 25908 || 2001 BJ || — || January 17, 2001 || Oizumi || T. Kobayashi || — || align=right | 3.7 km || 
|-id=909 bgcolor=#E9E9E9
| 25909 ||  || — || January 21, 2001 || Socorro || LINEAR || GEF || align=right | 5.0 km || 
|-id=910 bgcolor=#C2FFFF
| 25910 ||  || — || January 25, 2001 || Socorro || LINEAR || L4 || align=right | 25 km || 
|-id=911 bgcolor=#C2FFFF
| 25911 ||  || — || January 26, 2001 || Socorro || LINEAR || L4 || align=right | 18 km || 
|-id=912 bgcolor=#fefefe
| 25912 Recawkwell ||  ||  || February 1, 2001 || Socorro || LINEAR || V || align=right | 3.0 km || 
|-id=913 bgcolor=#E9E9E9
| 25913 Jamesgreen ||  ||  || February 2, 2001 || Anderson Mesa || LONEOS || — || align=right | 5.3 km || 
|-id=914 bgcolor=#E9E9E9
| 25914 Bair ||  ||  || February 2, 2001 || Anderson Mesa || LONEOS || — || align=right | 2.8 km || 
|-id=915 bgcolor=#E9E9E9
| 25915 Charlesmcguire ||  ||  || February 2, 2001 || Anderson Mesa || LONEOS || ADE || align=right | 12 km || 
|-id=916 bgcolor=#FFC2E0
| 25916 ||  || — || February 15, 2001 || Socorro || LINEAR || AMO +1km || align=right | 5.7 km || 
|-id=917 bgcolor=#d6d6d6
| 25917 ||  || — || February 17, 2001 || Višnjan Observatory || K. Korlević || — || align=right | 17 km || 
|-id=918 bgcolor=#fefefe
| 25918 ||  || — || February 19, 2001 || Oizumi || T. Kobayashi || — || align=right | 2.8 km || 
|-id=919 bgcolor=#d6d6d6
| 25919 Comuniello ||  ||  || February 16, 2001 || Socorro || LINEAR || EOS || align=right | 4.7 km || 
|-id=920 bgcolor=#d6d6d6
| 25920 Templeanne ||  ||  || February 16, 2001 || Socorro || LINEAR || EOS || align=right | 4.4 km || 
|-id=921 bgcolor=#d6d6d6
| 25921 ||  || — || February 16, 2001 || Socorro || LINEAR || AEG || align=right | 8.4 km || 
|-id=922 bgcolor=#d6d6d6
| 25922 ||  || — || February 16, 2001 || Socorro || LINEAR || EOS || align=right | 6.6 km || 
|-id=923 bgcolor=#E9E9E9
| 25923 ||  || — || February 17, 2001 || Socorro || LINEAR || — || align=right | 4.1 km || 
|-id=924 bgcolor=#fefefe
| 25924 Douglasadams ||  ||  || February 19, 2001 || Socorro || LINEAR || NYS || align=right | 2.4 km || 
|-id=925 bgcolor=#fefefe
| 25925 Jamesfenska ||  ||  || February 16, 2001 || Socorro || LINEAR || V || align=right | 2.5 km || 
|-id=926 bgcolor=#E9E9E9
| 25926 ||  || — || February 16, 2001 || Socorro || LINEAR || EUN || align=right | 3.5 km || 
|-id=927 bgcolor=#fefefe
| 25927 Jagandelman ||  ||  || February 16, 2001 || Socorro || LINEAR || — || align=right | 3.7 km || 
|-id=928 bgcolor=#fefefe
| 25928 ||  || — || February 17, 2001 || Socorro || LINEAR || — || align=right | 9.4 km || 
|-id=929 bgcolor=#d6d6d6
| 25929 ||  || — || February 17, 2001 || Socorro || LINEAR || — || align=right | 8.2 km || 
|-id=930 bgcolor=#fefefe
| 25930 Spielberg ||  ||  || February 21, 2001 || Desert Beaver || W. K. Y. Yeung || NYS || align=right | 1.9 km || 
|-id=931 bgcolor=#E9E9E9
| 25931 Peterhu ||  ||  || February 19, 2001 || Socorro || LINEAR || — || align=right | 4.8 km || 
|-id=932 bgcolor=#d6d6d6
| 25932 ||  || — || February 19, 2001 || Socorro || LINEAR || LIX || align=right | 6.3 km || 
|-id=933 bgcolor=#d6d6d6
| 25933 Ruoyijiang ||  ||  || February 19, 2001 || Socorro || LINEAR || KOR || align=right | 4.2 km || 
|-id=934 bgcolor=#E9E9E9
| 25934 ||  || — || February 19, 2001 || Socorro || LINEAR || — || align=right | 11 km || 
|-id=935 bgcolor=#E9E9E9
| 25935 ||  || — || February 19, 2001 || Socorro || LINEAR || EUN || align=right | 6.4 km || 
|-id=936 bgcolor=#fefefe
| 25936 ||  || — || February 20, 2001 || Haleakala || NEAT || — || align=right | 3.1 km || 
|-id=937 bgcolor=#C2FFFF
| 25937 Malysz ||  ||  || February 19, 2001 || Anderson Mesa || LONEOS || L4 || align=right | 15 km || 
|-id=938 bgcolor=#C2FFFF
| 25938 Stoch ||  ||  || February 16, 2001 || Socorro || LINEAR || L4 || align=right | 15 km || 
|-id=939 bgcolor=#fefefe
| 25939 || 2001 EQ || — || March 3, 2001 || Reedy Creek || J. Broughton || NYS || align=right | 1.6 km || 
|-id=940 bgcolor=#E9E9E9
| 25940 Mikeschottland ||  ||  || March 2, 2001 || Anderson Mesa || LONEOS || — || align=right | 6.7 km || 
|-id=941 bgcolor=#fefefe
| 25941 Susanahearn ||  ||  || March 2, 2001 || Anderson Mesa || LONEOS || V || align=right | 1.8 km || 
|-id=942 bgcolor=#d6d6d6
| 25942 Walborn ||  ||  || March 2, 2001 || Anderson Mesa || LONEOS || — || align=right | 8.0 km || 
|-id=943 bgcolor=#d6d6d6
| 25943 Billahearn ||  ||  || March 2, 2001 || Anderson Mesa || LONEOS || — || align=right | 10 km || 
|-id=944 bgcolor=#fefefe
| 25944 Charlesross ||  ||  || March 2, 2001 || Anderson Mesa || LONEOS || NYS || align=right | 2.9 km || 
|-id=945 bgcolor=#E9E9E9
| 25945 Moreadalleore ||  ||  || March 2, 2001 || Anderson Mesa || LONEOS || — || align=right | 2.2 km || 
|-id=946 bgcolor=#E9E9E9
| 25946 ||  || — || March 3, 2001 || Socorro || LINEAR || — || align=right | 3.2 km || 
|-id=947 bgcolor=#E9E9E9
| 25947 ||  || — || March 15, 2001 || Socorro || LINEAR || EUN || align=right | 4.5 km || 
|-id=948 bgcolor=#E9E9E9
| 25948 ||  || — || March 15, 2001 || Oizumi || T. Kobayashi || — || align=right | 5.4 km || 
|-id=949 bgcolor=#fefefe
| 25949 ||  || — || March 15, 2001 || Haleakala || NEAT || NYS || align=right | 1.7 km || 
|-id=950 bgcolor=#E9E9E9
| 25950 ||  || — || March 15, 2001 || Haleakala || NEAT || VIB || align=right | 5.1 km || 
|-id=951 bgcolor=#fefefe
| 25951 Pamross ||  ||  || March 15, 2001 || Anderson Mesa || LONEOS || V || align=right | 1.6 km || 
|-id=952 bgcolor=#E9E9E9
| 25952 ||  || — || March 17, 2001 || Socorro || LINEAR || — || align=right | 5.5 km || 
|-id=953 bgcolor=#E9E9E9
| 25953 Lanairlett ||  ||  || March 18, 2001 || Socorro || LINEAR || — || align=right | 3.7 km || 
|-id=954 bgcolor=#fefefe
| 25954 Trantow ||  ||  || March 19, 2001 || Anderson Mesa || LONEOS || FLO || align=right | 2.5 km || 
|-id=955 bgcolor=#E9E9E9
| 25955 Radway ||  ||  || March 19, 2001 || Anderson Mesa || LONEOS || — || align=right | 6.3 km || 
|-id=956 bgcolor=#d6d6d6
| 25956 Spanierbeckage ||  ||  || March 19, 2001 || Anderson Mesa || LONEOS || — || align=right | 10 km || 
|-id=957 bgcolor=#E9E9E9
| 25957 Davidconnell ||  ||  || March 19, 2001 || Anderson Mesa || LONEOS || AGN || align=right | 4.0 km || 
|-id=958 bgcolor=#fefefe
| 25958 Battams ||  ||  || March 19, 2001 || Anderson Mesa || LONEOS || — || align=right | 3.6 km || 
|-id=959 bgcolor=#fefefe
| 25959 Gingergiovale ||  ||  || March 19, 2001 || Anderson Mesa || LONEOS || — || align=right | 2.6 km || 
|-id=960 bgcolor=#E9E9E9
| 25960 Timheckman ||  ||  || March 19, 2001 || Anderson Mesa || LONEOS || — || align=right | 5.0 km || 
|-id=961 bgcolor=#E9E9E9
| 25961 Conti ||  ||  || March 21, 2001 || Anderson Mesa || LONEOS || — || align=right | 4.5 km || 
|-id=962 bgcolor=#E9E9E9
| 25962 Yifanli ||  ||  || March 18, 2001 || Socorro || LINEAR || — || align=right | 2.6 km || 
|-id=963 bgcolor=#fefefe
| 25963 Elisalin ||  ||  || March 18, 2001 || Socorro || LINEAR || FLO || align=right | 3.1 km || 
|-id=964 bgcolor=#fefefe
| 25964 Liudavid ||  ||  || March 18, 2001 || Socorro || LINEAR || — || align=right | 4.5 km || 
|-id=965 bgcolor=#fefefe
| 25965 Masihdas ||  ||  || March 18, 2001 || Socorro || LINEAR || NYS || align=right | 1.6 km || 
|-id=966 bgcolor=#E9E9E9
| 25966 Akhilmathew ||  ||  || March 19, 2001 || Socorro || LINEAR || — || align=right | 2.4 km || 
|-id=967 bgcolor=#E9E9E9
| 25967 ||  || — || March 19, 2001 || Socorro || LINEAR || EUN || align=right | 4.2 km || 
|-id=968 bgcolor=#fefefe
| 25968 ||  || — || March 21, 2001 || Haleakala || NEAT || — || align=right | 2.5 km || 
|-id=969 bgcolor=#E9E9E9
| 25969 ||  || — || March 18, 2001 || Socorro || LINEAR || — || align=right | 5.4 km || 
|-id=970 bgcolor=#E9E9E9
| 25970 Nelakanti ||  ||  || March 18, 2001 || Socorro || LINEAR || — || align=right | 4.9 km || 
|-id=971 bgcolor=#d6d6d6
| 25971 ||  || — || March 18, 2001 || Socorro || LINEAR || THM || align=right | 8.8 km || 
|-id=972 bgcolor=#fefefe
| 25972 Pfefferjosh ||  ||  || March 18, 2001 || Socorro || LINEAR || NYS || align=right | 1.6 km || 
|-id=973 bgcolor=#fefefe
| 25973 Puranik ||  ||  || March 18, 2001 || Socorro || LINEAR || — || align=right | 2.7 km || 
|-id=974 bgcolor=#FA8072
| 25974 ||  || — || March 18, 2001 || Socorro || LINEAR || — || align=right | 3.7 km || 
|-id=975 bgcolor=#d6d6d6
| 25975 ||  || — || March 18, 2001 || Socorro || LINEAR || EOS || align=right | 4.7 km || 
|-id=976 bgcolor=#d6d6d6
| 25976 ||  || — || March 18, 2001 || Socorro || LINEAR || — || align=right | 7.2 km || 
|-id=977 bgcolor=#d6d6d6
| 25977 ||  || — || March 18, 2001 || Socorro || LINEAR || — || align=right | 22 km || 
|-id=978 bgcolor=#E9E9E9
| 25978 Katerudolph ||  ||  || March 18, 2001 || Socorro || LINEAR || GEF || align=right | 4.4 km || 
|-id=979 bgcolor=#fefefe
| 25979 Alansage ||  ||  || March 18, 2001 || Socorro || LINEAR || — || align=right | 3.0 km || 
|-id=980 bgcolor=#fefefe
| 25980 ||  || — || March 18, 2001 || Socorro || LINEAR || — || align=right | 5.2 km || 
|-id=981 bgcolor=#fefefe
| 25981 Shahmirian ||  ||  || March 18, 2001 || Socorro || LINEAR || V || align=right | 1.8 km || 
|-id=982 bgcolor=#d6d6d6
| 25982 ||  || — || March 19, 2001 || Socorro || LINEAR || ALA || align=right | 16 km || 
|-id=983 bgcolor=#E9E9E9
| 25983 ||  || — || March 19, 2001 || Socorro || LINEAR || HNS || align=right | 6.0 km || 
|-id=984 bgcolor=#E9E9E9
| 25984 ||  || — || March 19, 2001 || Socorro || LINEAR || — || align=right | 7.1 km || 
|-id=985 bgcolor=#fefefe
| 25985 ||  || — || March 19, 2001 || Socorro || LINEAR || FLO || align=right | 2.2 km || 
|-id=986 bgcolor=#fefefe
| 25986 Sunanda ||  ||  || March 19, 2001 || Socorro || LINEAR || — || align=right | 2.9 km || 
|-id=987 bgcolor=#E9E9E9
| 25987 Katherynshi ||  ||  || March 19, 2001 || Socorro || LINEAR || — || align=right | 3.0 km || 
|-id=988 bgcolor=#E9E9E9
| 25988 Janesuh ||  ||  || March 19, 2001 || Socorro || LINEAR || — || align=right | 4.9 km || 
|-id=989 bgcolor=#d6d6d6
| 25989 ||  || — || March 19, 2001 || Socorro || LINEAR || — || align=right | 9.9 km || 
|-id=990 bgcolor=#fefefe
| 25990 ||  || — || March 19, 2001 || Socorro || LINEAR || — || align=right | 3.5 km || 
|-id=991 bgcolor=#fefefe
| 25991 ||  || — || March 19, 2001 || Socorro || LINEAR || — || align=right | 7.7 km || 
|-id=992 bgcolor=#fefefe
| 25992 Benjamensun ||  ||  || March 19, 2001 || Socorro || LINEAR || — || align=right | 3.6 km || 
|-id=993 bgcolor=#fefefe
| 25993 Kevinxu ||  ||  || March 21, 2001 || Socorro || LINEAR || — || align=right | 3.4 km || 
|-id=994 bgcolor=#fefefe
| 25994 Lynnelleye ||  ||  || March 21, 2001 || Socorro || LINEAR || V || align=right | 2.1 km || 
|-id=995 bgcolor=#fefefe
| 25995 ||  || — || March 24, 2001 || Socorro || LINEAR || NYS || align=right | 3.1 km || 
|-id=996 bgcolor=#fefefe
| 25996 ||  || — || March 26, 2001 || Kitt Peak || Spacewatch || — || align=right | 2.4 km || 
|-id=997 bgcolor=#d6d6d6
| 25997 ||  || — || March 26, 2001 || Socorro || LINEAR || — || align=right | 11 km || 
|-id=998 bgcolor=#E9E9E9
| 25998 ||  || — || March 16, 2001 || Socorro || LINEAR || EUN || align=right | 4.0 km || 
|-id=999 bgcolor=#d6d6d6
| 25999 ||  || — || March 16, 2001 || Socorro || LINEAR || EOS || align=right | 5.9 km || 
|-id=000 bgcolor=#E9E9E9
| 26000 ||  || — || March 16, 2001 || Socorro || LINEAR || EUN || align=right | 4.5 km || 
|}

References

External links 
 Discovery Circumstances: Numbered Minor Planets (25001)–(30000) (IAU Minor Planet Center)

0025